This is a partial list of unnumbered minor planets for principal provisional designations assigned during 16–31 March 2001. Since this period yielded a high number of provisional discoveries, it is further split into several standalone pages. , a total of 432 bodies remain unnumbered for this period. Objects for this year are listed on the following pages: A–E · Fi · Fii · G–O · P–R · S · T · U · V–W and X–Y. Also see previous and next year.

F 

|- id="2001 FZ" bgcolor=#FFC2E0
| 3 || 2001 FZ || AMO || 21.0 || data-sort-value="0.22" | 220 m || single || 210 days || 20 Sep 2001 || 77 || align=left | Disc.: LINEAR || 
|- id="2001 FX6" bgcolor=#FA8072
| 1 ||  || MCA || 18.51 || data-sort-value="0.59" | 590 m || multiple || 2001–2021 || 11 Nov 2021 || 90 || align=left | Disc.: LONEOSAlt.: 2004 FQ4 || 
|- id="2001 FE7" bgcolor=#FFC2E0
| 7 ||  || AMO || 23.4 || data-sort-value="0.074" | 74 m || single || 12 days || 31 Mar 2001 || 21 || align=left | Disc.: LINEAR || 
|- id="2001 FG24" bgcolor=#FA8072
| 1 ||  || MCA || 20.8 || data-sort-value="0.21" | 210 m || multiple || 2001–2020 || 14 Sep 2020 || 63 || align=left | Disc.: Spacewatch || 
|- id="2001 FP32" bgcolor=#FFC2E0
| – ||  || APO || 23.6 || data-sort-value="0.068" | 68 m || single || 4 days || 24 Mar 2001 || 15 || align=left | Disc.: AMOS || 
|- id="2001 FW32" bgcolor=#E9E9E9
| 0 ||  || MBA-M || 16.99 || 2.2 km || multiple || 2001–2021 || 02 Dec 2021 || 148 || align=left | Disc.: Prescott Obs.Alt.: 2010 EA121 || 
|- id="2001 FZ32" bgcolor=#FA8072
| – ||  || MCA || 20.7 || data-sort-value="0.22" | 220 m || single || 6 days || 29 Mar 2001 || 20 || align=left | Disc.: Spacewatch || 
|- id="2001 FC33" bgcolor=#FA8072
| 1 ||  || MCA || 18.4 || data-sort-value="0.62" | 620 m || multiple || 2001–2021 || 11 Jun 2021 || 185 || align=left | Disc.: LONEOSAlt.: 2011 EE54 || 
|- id="2001 FC50" bgcolor=#d6d6d6
| 1 ||  || MBA-O || 16.9 || 2.3 km || multiple || 2001–2020 || 29 Feb 2020 || 59 || align=left | Disc.: LINEAR || 
|- id="2001 FA58" bgcolor=#FFC2E0
| 0 ||  || APO || 21.4 || data-sort-value="0.19" | 190 m || multiple || 2001–2018 || 28 Mar 2018 || 99 || align=left | Disc.: LONEOSPotentially hazardous object || 
|- id="2001 FB58" bgcolor=#FFC2E0
| 6 ||  || AMO || 21.6 || data-sort-value="0.17" | 170 m || single || 21 days || 13 Apr 2001 || 25 || align=left | Disc.: LONEOS || 
|- id="2001 FC58" bgcolor=#FFC2E0
| 2 ||  || APO || 20.4 || data-sort-value="0.30" | 300 m || multiple || 2000–2008 || 22 May 2008 || 145 || align=left | Disc.: LINEARPotentially hazardous object || 
|- id="2001 FL84" bgcolor=#d6d6d6
| 0 ||  || MBA-O || 16.2 || 3.2 km || multiple || 1993–2021 || 17 Jan 2021 || 158 || align=left | Disc.: SpacewatchAlt.: 2014 UJ165, 2016 CM57 || 
|- id="2001 FZ84" bgcolor=#FA8072
| 0 ||  || MCA || 18.4 || data-sort-value="0.62" | 620 m || multiple || 2001–2021 || 07 Jan 2021 || 86 || align=left | Disc.: SpacewatchAlt.: 2011 CJ29 || 
|- id="2001 FR85" bgcolor=#FFC2E0
| 3 ||  || ATE || 24.8 || data-sort-value="0.039" | 39 m || single || 8 days || 02 Apr 2001 || 36 || align=left | Disc.: LINEAR || 
|- id="2001 FU85" bgcolor=#d6d6d6
| 0 ||  || MBA-O || 17.23 || 2.0 km || multiple || 2000–2022 || 13 Jan 2022 || 81 || align=left | Disc.: Cerro Tololo || 
|- id="2001 FV85" bgcolor=#d6d6d6
| 0 ||  || MBA-O || 16.8 || 2.4 km || multiple || 2001–2021 || 28 Nov 2021 || 57 || align=left | Disc.: Cerro TololoAdded on 21 August 2021 || 
|- id="2001 FW85" bgcolor=#fefefe
| 2 ||  || MBA-I || 17.5 || data-sort-value="0.94" | 940 m || multiple || 2001–2019 || 25 Sep 2019 || 118 || align=left | Disc.: Cerro Tololo || 
|- id="2001 FZ85" bgcolor=#E9E9E9
| 0 ||  || MBA-M || 18.16 || data-sort-value="0.69" | 690 m || multiple || 2001–2021 || 14 Apr 2021 || 50 || align=left | Disc.: Cerro TololoAlt.: 2015 XY126 || 
|- id="2001 FE86" bgcolor=#fefefe
| 0 ||  || MBA-I || 18.4 || data-sort-value="0.62" | 620 m || multiple || 2001–2019 || 22 Oct 2019 || 69 || align=left | Disc.: Cerro TololoAlt.: 2015 KR33 || 
|- id="2001 FG86" bgcolor=#E9E9E9
| 4 ||  || MBA-M || 18.34 || 1.2 km || multiple || 2001–2021 || 08 Sep 2021 || 31 || align=left | Disc.: Cerro Tololo || 
|- id="2001 FN89" bgcolor=#d6d6d6
| 0 ||  || MBA-O || 16.6 || 2.7 km || multiple || 1996–2021 || 10 Jan 2021 || 157 || align=left | Disc.: SpacewatchAlt.: 2014 WZ107 || 
|- id="2001 FB90" bgcolor=#FFC2E0
| 8 ||  || APO || 19.8 || data-sort-value="0.39" | 390 m || single || 11 days || 28 Mar 2001 || 34 || align=left | Disc.: AMOSPotentially hazardous object || 
|- id="2001 FC90" bgcolor=#FFC2E0
| 6 ||  || AMO || 21.4 || data-sort-value="0.19" | 190 m || single || 18 days || 13 Apr 2001 || 49 || align=left | Disc.: LINEAR || 
|- id="2001 FF90" bgcolor=#FFC2E0
| 0 ||  || APO || 17.27 || 1.2 km || multiple || 2001–2022 || 14 Jan 2022 || 121 || align=left | Disc.: AMOSNEO larger than 1 kilometer || 
|- id="2001 FW121" bgcolor=#fefefe
| 0 ||  || HUN || 18.16 || data-sort-value="0.33" | 680 m || multiple || 2001-2022 || 28 Apr 2022 || 151 || align=left | Disc.: Farpoint Obs.Added on 21 August 2021 || 
|- id="2001 FX125" bgcolor=#E9E9E9
| 0 ||  || MBA-M || 16.55 || 2.7 km || multiple || 1992–2021 || 29 Nov 2021 || 151 || align=left | Disc.: Spacewatch || 
|- id="2001 FJ126" bgcolor=#fefefe
| 0 ||  || MBA-I || 18.2 || data-sort-value="0.68" | 680 m || multiple || 2001–2020 || 08 Dec 2020 || 95 || align=left | Disc.: SpacewatchAlt.: 2015 FL182 || 
|- id="2001 FN127" bgcolor=#E9E9E9
| 2 ||  || MBA-M || 19.0 || data-sort-value="0.88" | 880 m || multiple || 2001–2020 || 24 May 2020 || 50 || align=left | Disc.: Spacewatch || 
|- id="2001 FO127" bgcolor=#FFC2E0
| 7 ||  || ATE || 27.5 || data-sort-value="0.011" | 11 m || single || 19 days || 18 Apr 2001 || 35 || align=left | Disc.: Kitt Peak Obs. || 
|- id="2001 FR128" bgcolor=#FFC2E0
| 3 ||  || APO || 19.9 || data-sort-value="0.37" | 370 m || multiple || 2001–2019 || 13 May 2019 || 144 || align=left | Disc.: LONEOS || 
|- id="2001 FL140" bgcolor=#fefefe
| 0 ||  || MBA-I || 17.71 || data-sort-value="0.85" | 850 m || multiple || 2001–2021 || 26 Oct 2021 || 199 || align=left | Disc.: AMOSAlt.: 2016 EY110 || 
|- id="2001 FU172" bgcolor=#C2E0FF
| 2 ||  || TNO || 8.4 || 99 km || multiple || 2001–2006 || 26 May 2006 || 31 || align=left | Disc.: Kitt Peak Obs.LoUTNOs, plutino, BR-mag: 3.57 || 
|- id="2001 FT173" bgcolor=#d6d6d6
| 0 ||  || MBA-O || 17.57 || 1.7 km || multiple || 2001–2021 || 31 Mar 2021 || 89 || align=left | Disc.: Spacewatch || 
|- id="2001 FX178" bgcolor=#fefefe
| 0 ||  || MBA-I || 18.81 || data-sort-value="0.51" | 510 m || multiple || 2001–2021 || 30 Nov 2021 || 69 || align=left | Disc.: SpacewatchAdded on 24 December 2021 || 
|- id="2001 FH180" bgcolor=#d6d6d6
| 0 ||  || MBA-O || 16.92 || 2.3 km || multiple || 2001–2022 || 25 Apr 2022 || 123 || align=left | Disc.: SpacewatchAlt.: 2009 VN12 || 
|- id="2001 FC181" bgcolor=#d6d6d6
| 2 ||  || MBA-O || 17.4 || 1.8 km || multiple || 2001–2018 || 16 Apr 2018 || 21 || align=left | Disc.: SpacewatchAdded on 17 January 2021 || 
|- id="2001 FH181" bgcolor=#fefefe
| 2 ||  || MBA-I || 19.0 || data-sort-value="0.47" | 470 m || multiple || 2001–2020 || 12 Apr 2020 || 57 || align=left | Disc.: Spacewatch || 
|- id="2001 FO181" bgcolor=#E9E9E9
| 0 ||  || MBA-M || 18.26 || data-sort-value="0.94" | 940 m || multiple || 2001–2021 || 28 Nov 2021 || 44 || align=left | Disc.: SpacewatchAdded on 19 October 2020 || 
|- id="2001 FF182" bgcolor=#E9E9E9
| 0 ||  || MBA-M || 17.6 || 1.3 km || multiple || 2001–2020 || 24 Oct 2020 || 93 || align=left | Disc.: LONEOS || 
|- id="2001 FM182" bgcolor=#d6d6d6
| 0 ||  || MBA-O || 16.7 || 2.5 km || multiple || 2001–2021 || 17 Jan 2021 || 66 || align=left | Disc.: Spacewatch || 
|- id="2001 FP183" bgcolor=#E9E9E9
| 0 ||  || MBA-M || 17.2 || 2.0 km || multiple || 2001–2021 || 14 Nov 2021 || 95 || align=left | Disc.: Kitt Peak Obs.Added on 5 November 2021 || 
|- id="2001 FW183" bgcolor=#fefefe
| 0 ||  || MBA-I || 18.6 || data-sort-value="0.57" | 570 m || multiple || 2001–2019 || 30 Jun 2019 || 44 || align=left | Disc.: Kitt Peak Obs.Added on 22 July 2020 || 
|- id="2001 FB185" bgcolor=#C2E0FF
| E ||  || TNO || 10.4 || 29 km || single || 1 day || 28 Mar 2001 || 4 || align=left | Disc.: Kitt Peak Obs.LoUTNOs, cubewano? || 
|- id="2001 FC185" bgcolor=#C2E0FF
| E ||  || TNO || 8.1 || 100 km || single || 1 day || 28 Mar 2001 || 4 || align=left | Disc.: Kitt Peak Obs.LoUTNOs, other TNO || 
|- id="2001 FK185" bgcolor=#C2E0FF
| 3 ||  || TNO || 7.70 || 96 km || multiple || 2001–2017 || 23 Feb 2017 || 58 || align=left | Disc.: Kitt Peak Obs.LoUTNOs, cubewano (cold) || 
|- id="2001 FL185" bgcolor=#C2E0FF
| 2 ||  || TNO || 7.1 || 126 km || multiple || 2001–2018 || 10 Apr 2018 || 38 || align=left | Disc.: Kitt Peak Obs.LoUTNOs, cubewano (cold), binary: 88 km || 
|- id="2001 FS185" bgcolor=#C2E0FF
| E ||  || TNO || 7.7 || 99 km || single || 57 days || 22 May 2001 || 4 || align=left | Disc.: Kitt Peak Obs.LoUTNOs, cubewano? || 
|- id="2001 FT185" bgcolor=#C2E0FF
| 3 ||  || TNO || 7.9 || 109 km || multiple || 2001–2016 || 13 Mar 2016 || 13 || align=left | Disc.: Kitt Peak Obs.LoUTNOs, other TNO || 
|- id="2001 FV185" bgcolor=#C2E0FF
| E ||  || TNO || 7.7 || 136 km || single || 57 days || 22 May 2001 || 4 || align=left | Disc.: Kitt Peak Obs.LoUTNOs, plutino? || 
|- id="2001 FM187" bgcolor=#E9E9E9
| 0 ||  = (603307) || MBA-M || 17.03 || 2 km || multiple || 2001-2022 || 19 Oct 2022 || 102 || align=left | Disc.: Spacewatch  || 
|- id="2001 FC193" bgcolor=#C2E0FF
| E ||  || TNO || 8.6 || 65 km || single || 1 day || 28 Mar 2001 || 4 || align=left | Disc.: Kitt Peak Obs.LoUTNOs, cubewano? || 
|- id="2001 FD193" bgcolor=#C2E0FF
| E ||  || TNO || 8.1 || 82 km || single || 1 day || 28 Mar 2001 || 4 || align=left | Disc.: Kitt Peak Obs.LoUTNOs, cubewano? || 
|- id="2001 FF193" bgcolor=#C2E0FF
| E ||  || TNO || 7.7 || 99 km || single || 1 day || 28 Mar 2001 || 4 || align=left | Disc.: Kitt Peak Obs.LoUTNOs, cubewano? || 
|- id="2001 FG193" bgcolor=#C2E0FF
| E ||  || TNO || 8.5 || 68 km || single || 1 day || 28 Mar 2001 || 4 || align=left | Disc.: Kitt Peak Obs.LoUTNOs, cubewano? || 
|- id="2001 FJ193" bgcolor=#C2E0FF
| E ||  || TNO || 9.3 || 65 km || single || 1 day || 28 Mar 2001 || 4 || align=left | Disc.: Kitt Peak Obs.LoUTNOs, plutino? || 
|- id="2001 FK193" bgcolor=#C2E0FF
| 3 ||  || TNO || 6.8 || 145 km || multiple || 2001–2019 || 07 May 2019 || 24 || align=left | Disc.: Kitt Peak Obs.LoUTNOs, cubewano (cold) || 
|- id="2001 FJ194" bgcolor=#C2E0FF
| 4 ||  || TNO || 7.39 || 120 km || multiple || 2001-2013 || 16 Apr 2013 || 21 || align=left | Disc.: Kitt Peak Obs.LoUTNOs, SDO || 
|- id="2001 FK194" bgcolor=#C2E0FF
| E ||  || TNO || 8.9 || 92 km || single || 8 days || 30 Mar 2001 || 12 || align=left | Disc.: Kitt Peak Obs.LoUTNOs, centaur || 
|- id="2001 FM194" bgcolor=#C2E0FF
| 2 ||  || TNO || 7.5 || 119 km || multiple || 2001–2019 || 06 Jun 2019 || 31 || align=left | Disc.: Kitt Peak Obs.LoUTNOs, SDO, BR-mag: 1.19; taxonomy: BR || 
|- id="2001 FN194" bgcolor=#C2E0FF
| E ||  || TNO || 8.3 || 83 km || single || 9 days || 31 Mar 2001 || 9 || align=left | Disc.: Kitt Peak Obs.LoUTNOs, SDO || 
|- id="2001 FZ196" bgcolor=#E9E9E9
| 0 ||  || MBA-M || 16.90 || 2.3 km || multiple || 2001–2021 || 08 Nov 2021 || 184 || align=left | Disc.: AMOS || 
|- id="2001 FB197" bgcolor=#E9E9E9
| 0 ||  || MBA-M || 17.9 || data-sort-value="0.78" | 780 m || multiple || 2001–2021 || 16 Feb 2021 || 74 || align=left | Disc.: Cerro TololoAdded on 9 March 2021Alt.: 2015 RH52 || 
|- id="2001 FF197" bgcolor=#E9E9E9
| 0 ||  || MBA-M || 18.3 || data-sort-value="0.92" | 920 m || multiple || 2001–2020 || 14 Dec 2020 || 27 || align=left | Disc.: SpacewatchAdded on 17 June 2021 || 
|- id="2001 FH197" bgcolor=#E9E9E9
| – ||  || MBA-M || 18.1 || 1.3 km || single || 9 days || 30 Mar 2001 || 16 || align=left | Disc.: Kitt Peak Obs. || 
|- id="2001 FJ197" bgcolor=#d6d6d6
| – ||  || MBA-O || 18.7 || 1.0 km || single || 10 days || 31 Mar 2001 || 22 || align=left | Disc.: Kitt Peak Obs. || 
|- id="2001 FK197" bgcolor=#E9E9E9
| – ||  || MBA-M || 18.2 || data-sort-value="0.96" | 960 m || single || 10 days || 31 Mar 2001 || 17 || align=left | Disc.: Kitt Peak Obs. || 
|- id="2001 FM197" bgcolor=#d6d6d6
| 0 ||  || MBA-O || 18.1 || 1.3 km || multiple || 2001–2020 || 23 Jan 2020 || 43 || align=left | Disc.: Kitt Peak Obs. || 
|- id="2001 FN197" bgcolor=#E9E9E9
| – ||  || MBA-M || 20.5 || data-sort-value="0.24" | 240 m || single || 9 days || 30 Mar 2001 || 10 || align=left | Disc.: Kitt Peak Obs. || 
|- id="2001 FP197" bgcolor=#d6d6d6
| 5 ||  || MBA-O || 17.5 || 1.8 km || multiple || 2001–2010 || 04 Feb 2010 || 20 || align=left | Disc.: Spacewatch || 
|- id="2001 FR197" bgcolor=#fefefe
| 2 ||  || MBA-I || 19.1 || data-sort-value="0.45" | 450 m || multiple || 1999–2019 || 22 Oct 2019 || 42 || align=left | Disc.: Kitt Peak Obs.Alt.: 2009 RV23 || 
|- id="2001 FU197" bgcolor=#E9E9E9
| – ||  || MBA-M || 18.7 || 1.0 km || single || 10 days || 31 Mar 2001 || 14 || align=left | Disc.: Kitt Peak Obs. || 
|- id="2001 FW197" bgcolor=#E9E9E9
| – ||  || MBA-M || 18.2 || data-sort-value="0.68" | 680 m || single || 9 days || 30 Mar 2001 || 13 || align=left | Disc.: Kitt Peak Obs. || 
|- id="2001 FY197" bgcolor=#d6d6d6
| – ||  || MBA-O || 18.4 || 1.2 km || single || 8 days || 29 Mar 2001 || 11 || align=left | Disc.: Kitt Peak Obs. || 
|- id="2001 FA198" bgcolor=#fefefe
| 2 ||  || MBA-I || 18.8 || data-sort-value="0.52" | 520 m || multiple || 2001–2020 || 18 Sep 2020 || 44 || align=left | Disc.: Kitt Peak Obs. || 
|- id="2001 FC198" bgcolor=#d6d6d6
| 0 ||  || MBA-O || 17.5 || 1.8 km || multiple || 2001–2020 || 11 Dec 2020 || 60 || align=left | Disc.: Kitt Peak Obs. || 
|- id="2001 FD198" bgcolor=#fefefe
| – ||  || MBA-I || 20.6 || data-sort-value="0.23" | 230 m || single || 10 days || 31 Mar 2001 || 19 || align=left | Disc.: Kitt Peak Obs. || 
|- id="2001 FG198" bgcolor=#fefefe
| – ||  || MBA-I || 19.3 || data-sort-value="0.41" | 410 m || single || 10 days || 31 Mar 2001 || 12 || align=left | Disc.: Kitt Peak Obs. || 
|- id="2001 FJ198" bgcolor=#E9E9E9
| – ||  || MBA-M || 19.7 || data-sort-value="0.64" | 640 m || single || 10 days || 31 Mar 2001 || 13 || align=left | Disc.: Kitt Peak Obs. || 
|- id="2001 FK198" bgcolor=#E9E9E9
| 0 ||  || MBA-M || 17.6 || 1.3 km || multiple || 2001–2020 || 06 Dec 2020 || 98 || align=left | Disc.: Kitt Peak Obs. || 
|- id="2001 FL198" bgcolor=#E9E9E9
| 0 ||  || MBA-M || 17.7 || 1.6 km || multiple || 2001–2020 || 08 Sep 2020 || 83 || align=left | Disc.: Kitt Peak Obs.Alt.: 2007 TG7 || 
|- id="2001 FN198" bgcolor=#E9E9E9
| 1 ||  || MBA-M || 18.4 || 1.2 km || multiple || 2001–2017 || 09 Dec 2017 || 54 || align=left | Disc.: Kitt Peak Obs. || 
|- id="2001 FO198" bgcolor=#E9E9E9
| 8 ||  || MBA-M || 18.4 || data-sort-value="0.88" | 880 m || single || 10 days || 31 Mar 2001 || 17 || align=left | Disc.: Kitt Peak Obs. || 
|- id="2001 FP198" bgcolor=#d6d6d6
| – ||  || MBA-O || 18.8 || data-sort-value="0.97" | 970 m || single || 10 days || 31 Mar 2001 || 19 || align=left | Disc.: Kitt Peak Obs. || 
|- id="2001 FR198" bgcolor=#d6d6d6
| – ||  || HIL || 17.9 || 1.5 km || single || 10 days || 31 Mar 2001 || 20 || align=left | Disc.: Kitt Peak Obs. || 
|- id="2001 FS198" bgcolor=#fefefe
| – ||  || MBA-I || 19.0 || data-sort-value="0.47" | 470 m || single || 10 days || 31 Mar 2001 || 16 || align=left | Disc.: Kitt Peak Obs. || 
|- id="2001 FT198" bgcolor=#fefefe
| – ||  || MBA-I || 19.7 || data-sort-value="0.34" | 340 m || single || 9 days || 30 Mar 2001 || 16 || align=left | Disc.: Kitt Peak Obs. || 
|- id="2001 FU198" bgcolor=#d6d6d6
| 1 ||  || MBA-O || 17.68 || 1.6 km || multiple || 2001–2020 || 23 Sep 2020 || 45 || align=left | Disc.: Kitt Peak Obs. || 
|- id="2001 FV198" bgcolor=#d6d6d6
| – ||  || MBA-O || 18.9 || data-sort-value="0.92" | 920 m || single || 10 days || 31 Mar 2001 || 16 || align=left | Disc.: Kitt Peak Obs. || 
|- id="2001 FW198" bgcolor=#E9E9E9
| – ||  || MBA-M || 18.6 || data-sort-value="0.80" | 800 m || single || 10 days || 31 Mar 2001 || 12 || align=left | Disc.: Kitt Peak Obs. || 
|- id="2001 FX198" bgcolor=#fefefe
| – ||  || MBA-I || 19.2 || data-sort-value="0.43" | 430 m || single || 9 days || 30 Mar 2001 || 15 || align=left | Disc.: Kitt Peak Obs. || 
|- id="2001 FY198" bgcolor=#E9E9E9
| 1 ||  || MBA-M || 17.8 || 1.5 km || multiple || 2001–2021 || 30 Oct 2021 || 54 || align=left | Disc.: Kitt Peak Obs. || 
|- id="2001 FZ198" bgcolor=#E9E9E9
| 0 ||  || MBA-M || 17.45 || 1.8 km || multiple || 2001–2021 || 28 Sep 2021 || 81 || align=left | Disc.: Kitt Peak Obs. || 
|- id="2001 FA199" bgcolor=#fefefe
| – ||  || MBA-I || 19.5 || data-sort-value="0.37" | 370 m || single || 10 days || 31 Mar 2001 || 19 || align=left | Disc.: Kitt Peak Obs. || 
|- id="2001 FD199" bgcolor=#fefefe
| 0 ||  || MBA-I || 18.79 || data-sort-value="0.52" | 520 m || multiple || 2001–2021 || 08 May 2021 || 109 || align=left | Disc.: Kitt Peak Obs.Alt.: 2014 BJ30 || 
|- id="2001 FE199" bgcolor=#E9E9E9
| – ||  || MBA-M || 18.0 || 1.1 km || single || 10 days || 31 Mar 2001 || 10 || align=left | Disc.: Kitt Peak Obs. || 
|- id="2001 FG199" bgcolor=#E9E9E9
| – ||  || MBA-M || 19.6 || data-sort-value="0.67" | 670 m || single || 10 days || 31 Mar 2001 || 9 || align=left | Disc.: Kitt Peak Obs. || 
|- id="2001 FH199" bgcolor=#d6d6d6
| 1 ||  || MBA-O || 18.13 || 1.3 km || multiple || 2001-2022 || 21 Jun 2022 || 34 || align=left | Disc.: Kitt Peak Obs.Alt.: 2021 FN52 || 
|- id="2001 FJ199" bgcolor=#E9E9E9
| – ||  || MBA-M || 19.3 || data-sort-value="0.77" | 770 m || single || 8 days || 29 Mar 2001 || 10 || align=left | Disc.: Kitt Peak Obs. || 
|- id="2001 FK199" bgcolor=#E9E9E9
| – ||  || MBA-M || 19.3 || data-sort-value="0.41" | 410 m || single || 8 days || 29 Mar 2001 || 10 || align=left | Disc.: Kitt Peak Obs. || 
|- id="2001 FL199" bgcolor=#d6d6d6
| 0 ||  || MBA-O || 17.7 || 1.6 km || multiple || 2001–2018 || 13 Dec 2018 || 52 || align=left | Disc.: Kitt Peak Obs.Alt.: 2003 UZ441, 2017 QN13 || 
|- id="2001 FM199" bgcolor=#E9E9E9
| 2 ||  || MBA-M || 18.9 || data-sort-value="0.49" | 490 m || multiple || 2001–2018 || 18 Jun 2018 || 22 || align=left | Disc.: Kitt Peak Obs. || 
|- id="2001 FO199" bgcolor=#d6d6d6
| – ||  || MBA-O || 17.7 || 1.6 km || single || 10 days || 31 Mar 2001 || 14 || align=left | Disc.: Kitt Peak Obs. || 
|- id="2001 FP199" bgcolor=#E9E9E9
| – ||  || MBA-M || 19.6 || data-sort-value="0.36" | 360 m || single || 10 days || 31 Mar 2001 || 16 || align=left | Disc.: Kitt Peak Obs. || 
|- id="2001 FQ199" bgcolor=#d6d6d6
| 2 ||  || MBA-O || 18.1 || 1.3 km || multiple || 2001–2017 || 25 Apr 2017 || 48 || align=left | Disc.: Kitt Peak Obs. || 
|- id="2001 FR199" bgcolor=#fefefe
| 2 ||  || MBA-I || 18.5 || data-sort-value="0.59" | 590 m || multiple || 2001–2015 || 17 Apr 2015 || 49 || align=left | Disc.: Kitt Peak Obs. || 
|- id="2001 FS199" bgcolor=#fefefe
| 0 ||  || MBA-I || 18.73 || data-sort-value="0.53" | 530 m || multiple || 2001–2021 || 04 May 2021 || 93 || align=left | Disc.: Kitt Peak Obs. || 
|- id="2001 FU199" bgcolor=#E9E9E9
| 0 ||  || MBA-M || 17.9 || 1.5 km || multiple || 2001–2017 || 25 Nov 2017 || 48 || align=left | Disc.: Kitt Peak Obs.Alt.: 2012 TT92, 2012 TY323 || 
|- id="2001 FV199" bgcolor=#E9E9E9
| 0 ||  || MBA-M || 18.19 || data-sort-value="0.97" | 970 m || multiple || 2001–2022 || 06 Jan 2022 || 40 || align=left | Disc.: Kitt Peak Obs. || 
|- id="2001 FW199" bgcolor=#E9E9E9
| – ||  || MBA-M || 19.3 || data-sort-value="0.77" | 770 m || single || 10 days || 31 Mar 2001 || 14 || align=left | Disc.: Kitt Peak Obs. || 
|- id="2001 FX199" bgcolor=#fefefe
| – ||  || MBA-I || 21.0 || data-sort-value="0.19" | 190 m || single || 10 days || 31 Mar 2001 || 19 || align=left | Disc.: Kitt Peak Obs. || 
|- id="2001 FY199" bgcolor=#E9E9E9
| – ||  || MBA-M || 18.8 || data-sort-value="0.52" | 520 m || single || 10 days || 31 Mar 2001 || 17 || align=left | Disc.: Kitt Peak Obs. || 
|- id="2001 FA200" bgcolor=#fefefe
| – ||  || MBA-I || 20.0 || data-sort-value="0.30" | 300 m || single || 9 days || 30 Mar 2001 || 13 || align=left | Disc.: Kitt Peak Obs. || 
|- id="2001 FB200" bgcolor=#fefefe
| – ||  || MBA-I || 20.0 || data-sort-value="0.30" | 300 m || single || 9 days || 30 Mar 2001 || 10 || align=left | Disc.: Kitt Peak Obs. || 
|- id="2001 FC200" bgcolor=#E9E9E9
| – ||  || MBA-M || 18.5 || 1.1 km || single || 10 days || 31 Mar 2001 || 14 || align=left | Disc.: Kitt Peak Obs. || 
|- id="2001 FD200" bgcolor=#d6d6d6
| – ||  || MBA-O || 18.9 || data-sort-value="0.92" | 920 m || single || 10 days || 31 Mar 2001 || 18 || align=left | Disc.: Kitt Peak Obs. || 
|- id="2001 FE200" bgcolor=#d6d6d6
| – ||  || MBA-O || 17.7 || 1.6 km || single || 8 days || 29 Mar 2001 || 10 || align=left | Disc.: Kitt Peak Obs. || 
|- id="2001 FF200" bgcolor=#E9E9E9
| – ||  || MBA-M || 18.4 || data-sort-value="0.62" | 620 m || single || 10 days || 31 Mar 2001 || 15 || align=left | Disc.: Kitt Peak Obs. || 
|- id="2001 FG200" bgcolor=#d6d6d6
| – ||  || MBA-O || 19.3 || data-sort-value="0.77" | 770 m || single || 8 days || 29 Mar 2001 || 9 || align=left | Disc.: Kitt Peak Obs. || 
|- id="2001 FH200" bgcolor=#E9E9E9
| – ||  || MBA-M || 18.4 || 1.2 km || single || 10 days || 31 Mar 2001 || 17 || align=left | Disc.: Kitt Peak Obs. || 
|- id="2001 FJ200" bgcolor=#fefefe
| – ||  || MBA-I || 20.3 || data-sort-value="0.26" | 260 m || single || 10 days || 31 Mar 2001 || 17 || align=left | Disc.: Kitt Peak Obs. || 
|- id="2001 FK200" bgcolor=#E9E9E9
| 0 ||  || MBA-M || 18.08 || 1.3 km || multiple || 2001–2021 || 27 Oct 2021 || 64 || align=left | Disc.: Kitt Peak Obs.Alt.: 2021 PU38 || 
|- id="2001 FL200" bgcolor=#fefefe
| 2 ||  || MBA-I || 19.1 || data-sort-value="0.45" | 450 m || multiple || 2001–2017 || 17 Nov 2017 || 24 || align=left | Disc.: Kitt Peak Obs. || 
|- id="2001 FM200" bgcolor=#d6d6d6
| – ||  || MBA-O || 18.3 || 1.2 km || single || 10 days || 31 Mar 2001 || 13 || align=left | Disc.: Kitt Peak Obs. || 
|- id="2001 FN200" bgcolor=#d6d6d6
| 0 ||  || MBA-O || 17.6 || 1.7 km || multiple || 2001–2020 || 22 Mar 2020 || 58 || align=left | Disc.: Kitt Peak Obs.Alt.: 2008 UE16 || 
|- id="2001 FO200" bgcolor=#d6d6d6
| – ||  || MBA-O || 17.8 || 1.5 km || single || 9 days || 30 Mar 2001 || 17 || align=left | Disc.: Kitt Peak Obs. || 
|- id="2001 FP200" bgcolor=#d6d6d6
| – ||  || MBA-O || 17.9 || 1.5 km || single || 9 days || 30 Mar 2001 || 20 || align=left | Disc.: Kitt Peak Obs. || 
|- id="2001 FQ200" bgcolor=#d6d6d6
| – ||  || MBA-O || 18.7 || 1.0 km || single || 10 days || 31 Mar 2001 || 21 || align=left | Disc.: Kitt Peak Obs. || 
|- id="2001 FR200" bgcolor=#E9E9E9
| – ||  || MBA-M || 19.8 || data-sort-value="0.46" | 460 m || single || 9 days || 30 Mar 2001 || 16 || align=left | Disc.: Kitt Peak Obs. || 
|- id="2001 FS200" bgcolor=#fefefe
| 1 ||  || MBA-I || 18.7 || data-sort-value="0.54" | 540 m || multiple || 2001–2020 || 23 Aug 2020 || 53 || align=left | Disc.: Kitt Peak Obs. || 
|- id="2001 FT200" bgcolor=#fefefe
| 0 ||  || MBA-I || 18.5 || data-sort-value="0.59" | 590 m || multiple || 2001–2020 || 23 Jan 2020 || 71 || align=left | Disc.: Kitt Peak Obs.Alt.: 2015 RH7 || 
|- id="2001 FU200" bgcolor=#d6d6d6
| – ||  || MBA-O || 19.4 || data-sort-value="0.73" | 730 m || single || 8 days || 29 Mar 2001 || 13 || align=left | Disc.: Kitt Peak Obs. || 
|- id="2001 FW200" bgcolor=#E9E9E9
| 2 ||  || MBA-M || 18.77 || data-sort-value="0.92" | 960 m || multiple || 2001-2022 || 26 Nov 2022 || 41 || align=left | Disc.: Kitt Peak Obs. || 
|- id="2001 FX200" bgcolor=#E9E9E9
| – ||  || MBA-M || 18.5 || 1.1 km || single || 10 days || 31 Mar 2001 || 21 || align=left | Disc.: Kitt Peak Obs. || 
|- id="2001 FY200" bgcolor=#d6d6d6
| – ||  || MBA-O || 19.5 || data-sort-value="0.70" | 700 m || single || 9 days || 30 Mar 2001 || 13 || align=left | Disc.: Kitt Peak Obs. || 
|- id="2001 FZ200" bgcolor=#fefefe
| – ||  || MBA-I || 20.8 || data-sort-value="0.21" | 210 m || single || 8 days || 29 Mar 2001 || 14 || align=left | Disc.: Kitt Peak Obs. || 
|- id="2001 FA201" bgcolor=#fefefe
| – ||  || MBA-I || 19.5 || data-sort-value="0.37" | 370 m || single || 10 days || 31 Mar 2001 || 20 || align=left | Disc.: Kitt Peak Obs. || 
|- id="2001 FB201" bgcolor=#d6d6d6
| – ||  || MBA-O || 17.9 || 1.5 km || single || 10 days || 31 Mar 2001 || 20 || align=left | Disc.: Kitt Peak Obs. || 
|- id="2001 FC201" bgcolor=#fefefe
| – ||  || MBA-I || 21.0 || data-sort-value="0.19" | 190 m || single || 8 days || 29 Mar 2001 || 13 || align=left | Disc.: Kitt Peak Obs. || 
|- id="2001 FD201" bgcolor=#fefefe
| – ||  || MBA-I || 19.3 || data-sort-value="0.41" | 410 m || single || 10 days || 31 Mar 2001 || 21 || align=left | Disc.: Kitt Peak Obs. || 
|- id="2001 FE201" bgcolor=#d6d6d6
| – ||  || MBA-O || 18.2 || 1.3 km || single || 10 days || 31 Mar 2001 || 17 || align=left | Disc.: Kitt Peak Obs. || 
|- id="2001 FG201" bgcolor=#d6d6d6
| – ||  || MBA-O || 18.5 || 1.1 km || single || 10 days || 31 Mar 2001 || 21 || align=left | Disc.: Kitt Peak Obs. || 
|- id="2001 FH201" bgcolor=#fefefe
| – ||  || MBA-I || 19.1 || data-sort-value="0.45" | 450 m || single || 2 days || 23 Mar 2001 || 10 || align=left | Disc.: Kitt Peak Obs. || 
|- id="2001 FJ201" bgcolor=#d6d6d6
| – ||  || MBA-O || 19.1 || data-sort-value="0.84" | 840 m || single || 10 days || 31 Mar 2001 || 13 || align=left | Disc.: Kitt Peak Obs. || 
|- id="2001 FK201" bgcolor=#E9E9E9
| 1 ||  || MBA-M || 17.8 || data-sort-value="0.82" | 820 m || multiple || 2001–2021 || 17 Jan 2021 || 93 || align=left | Disc.: Kitt Peak Obs. || 
|- id="2001 FL201" bgcolor=#d6d6d6
| 1 ||  || MBA-O || 17.4 || 1.8 km || multiple || 2001–2021 || 17 Jan 2021 || 39 || align=left | Disc.: Kitt Peak Obs. || 
|- id="2001 FM201" bgcolor=#E9E9E9
| – ||  || MBA-M || 18.9 || data-sort-value="0.49" | 490 m || single || 10 days || 31 Mar 2001 || 18 || align=left | Disc.: Kitt Peak Obs. || 
|- id="2001 FN201" bgcolor=#d6d6d6
| – ||  || MBA-O || 17.5 || 1.8 km || single || 10 days || 31 Mar 2001 || 17 || align=left | Disc.: Kitt Peak Obs. || 
|- id="2001 FO201" bgcolor=#fefefe
| 1 ||  || MBA-I || 18.8 || data-sort-value="0.52" | 520 m || multiple || 2001–2020 || 17 Nov 2020 || 52 || align=left | Disc.: Kitt Peak Obs. || 
|- id="2001 FQ201" bgcolor=#fefefe
| – ||  || MBA-I || 19.9 || data-sort-value="0.31" | 310 m || single || 10 days || 31 Mar 2001 || 17 || align=left | Disc.: Kitt Peak Obs. || 
|- id="2001 FR201" bgcolor=#d6d6d6
| – ||  || MBA-O || 18.8 || data-sort-value="0.97" | 970 m || single || 10 days || 31 Mar 2001 || 14 || align=left | Disc.: Kitt Peak Obs. || 
|- id="2001 FS201" bgcolor=#d6d6d6
| – ||  || MBA-O || 17.9 || 1.5 km || single || 10 days || 31 Mar 2001 || 17 || align=left | Disc.: Kitt Peak Obs. || 
|- id="2001 FT201" bgcolor=#E9E9E9
| – ||  || MBA-M || 17.1 || 1.1 km || single || 2 days || 23 Mar 2001 || 10 || align=left | Disc.: Kitt Peak Obs. || 
|- id="2001 FX201" bgcolor=#d6d6d6
| – ||  || MBA-O || 18.7 || 1.0 km || single || 2 days || 23 Mar 2001 || 10 || align=left | Disc.: Kitt Peak Obs. || 
|- id="2001 FY201" bgcolor=#E9E9E9
| – ||  || MBA-M || 19.5 || data-sort-value="0.37" | 370 m || single || 10 days || 31 Mar 2001 || 17 || align=left | Disc.: Kitt Peak Obs. || 
|- id="2001 FA202" bgcolor=#d6d6d6
| – ||  || MBA-O || 18.1 || 1.3 km || single || 9 days || 30 Mar 2001 || 13 || align=left | Disc.: Kitt Peak Obs. || 
|- id="2001 FB202" bgcolor=#E9E9E9
| 0 ||  || MBA-M || 18.66 || data-sort-value="0.76" | 760 m || multiple || 2001-2022 || 01 Mar 2022 || 119 || align=left | Disc.: Kitt Peak Obs.Alt.: 2012 XS88, 2016 UT212, 2018 EZ15  || 
|- id="2001 FC202" bgcolor=#d6d6d6
| – ||  || MBA-O || 18.3 || 1.2 km || single || 10 days || 31 Mar 2001 || 13 || align=left | Disc.: Kitt Peak Obs. || 
|- id="2001 FD202" bgcolor=#d6d6d6
| – ||  || MBA-O || 18.5 || 1.1 km || single || 8 days || 29 Mar 2001 || 13 || align=left | Disc.: Kitt Peak Obs. || 
|- id="2001 FE202" bgcolor=#fefefe
| – ||  || MBA-I || 20.7 || data-sort-value="0.22" | 220 m || single || 10 days || 31 Mar 2001 || 11 || align=left | Disc.: Kitt Peak Obs. || 
|- id="2001 FF202" bgcolor=#d6d6d6
| – ||  || MBA-O || 20.0 || data-sort-value="0.56" | 560 m || single || 8 days || 29 Mar 2001 || 9 || align=left | Disc.: Kitt Peak Obs. || 
|- id="2001 FH202" bgcolor=#d6d6d6
| – ||  || MBA-O || 17.5 || 1.8 km || single || 10 days || 31 Mar 2001 || 17 || align=left | Disc.: Kitt Peak Obs. || 
|- id="2001 FL202" bgcolor=#d6d6d6
| – ||  || MBA-O || 18.5 || 1.1 km || single || 10 days || 31 Mar 2001 || 20 || align=left | Disc.: Kitt Peak Obs. || 
|- id="2001 FO202" bgcolor=#E9E9E9
| 5 ||  || MBA-M || 19.1 || data-sort-value="0.64" | 640 m || multiple || 2001–2015 || 11 Aug 2015 || 22 || align=left | Disc.: Kitt Peak Obs.Alt.: 2015 PV87 || 
|- id="2001 FP202" bgcolor=#E9E9E9
| 0 ||  || MBA-M || 17.91 || 1.5 km || multiple || 2001–2021 || 27 Oct 2021 || 85 || align=left | Disc.: Kitt Peak Obs.Alt.: 2003 UL346, 2008 WQ77 || 
|- id="2001 FQ202" bgcolor=#fefefe
| – ||  || MBA-I || 21.5 || data-sort-value="0.15" | 150 m || single || 10 days || 31 Mar 2001 || 14 || align=left | Disc.: Kitt Peak Obs. || 
|- id="2001 FS202" bgcolor=#fefefe
| – ||  || MBA-I || 19.2 || data-sort-value="0.43" | 430 m || single || 10 days || 31 Mar 2001 || 17 || align=left | Disc.: Kitt Peak Obs. || 
|- id="2001 FV202" bgcolor=#E9E9E9
| 2 ||  || MBA-M || 18.6 || data-sort-value="0.57" | 570 m || multiple || 2001–2020 || 17 Oct 2020 || 44 || align=left | Disc.: Kitt Peak Obs. || 
|- id="2001 FY202" bgcolor=#fefefe
| – ||  || MBA-I || 18.8 || data-sort-value="0.52" | 520 m || single || 10 days || 31 Mar 2001 || 20 || align=left | Disc.: Kitt Peak Obs. || 
|- id="2001 FZ202" bgcolor=#d6d6d6
| – ||  || MBA-O || 18.4 || 1.2 km || single || 10 days || 31 Mar 2001 || 13 || align=left | Disc.: Kitt Peak Obs. || 
|- id="2001 FB203" bgcolor=#fefefe
| 0 ||  || MBA-I || 18.72 || data-sort-value="0.43" | 550 m || multiple || 2001-2021 || 02 Dec 2021 || 40 || align=left | Disc.: Kitt Peak Obs. || 
|- id="2001 FC203" bgcolor=#fefefe
| – ||  || MBA-I || 19.9 || data-sort-value="0.31" | 310 m || single || 10 days || 31 Mar 2001 || 13 || align=left | Disc.: Kitt Peak Obs. || 
|- id="2001 FD203" bgcolor=#d6d6d6
| – ||  || MBA-O || 18.5 || 1.1 km || single || 8 days || 29 Mar 2001 || 10 || align=left | Disc.: Kitt Peak Obs. || 
|- id="2001 FE203" bgcolor=#fefefe
| – ||  || MBA-I || 19.5 || data-sort-value="0.37" | 370 m || single || 10 days || 31 Mar 2001 || 10 || align=left | Disc.: Kitt Peak Obs. || 
|- id="2001 FH203" bgcolor=#E9E9E9
| 0 ||  || MBA-M || 17.7 || 1.2 km || multiple || 2001–2020 || 16 Oct 2020 || 111 || align=left | Disc.: Kitt Peak Obs.Alt.: 2007 TK209 || 
|- id="2001 FJ203" bgcolor=#d6d6d6
| – ||  || MBA-O || 17.5 || 1.8 km || single || 9 days || 30 Mar 2001 || 9 || align=left | Disc.: Kitt Peak Obs. || 
|- id="2001 FK203" bgcolor=#d6d6d6
| – ||  || MBA-O || 18.3 || 1.2 km || single || 10 days || 31 Mar 2001 || 17 || align=left | Disc.: Kitt Peak Obs. || 
|- id="2001 FL203" bgcolor=#d6d6d6
| – ||  || MBA-O || 18.2 || 1.3 km || single || 8 days || 29 Mar 2001 || 13 || align=left | Disc.: Kitt Peak Obs. || 
|- id="2001 FM203" bgcolor=#d6d6d6
| – ||  || MBA-O || 17.0 || 2.2 km || single || 2 days || 23 Mar 2001 || 10 || align=left | Disc.: Kitt Peak Obs. || 
|- id="2001 FO203" bgcolor=#fefefe
| – ||  || MBA-I || 20.9 || data-sort-value="0.20" | 200 m || single || 10 days || 31 Mar 2001 || 13 || align=left | Disc.: Kitt Peak Obs. || 
|- id="2001 FP203" bgcolor=#E9E9E9
| – ||  || MBA-M || 18.8 || data-sort-value="0.97" | 970 m || single || 9 days || 30 Mar 2001 || 16 || align=left | Disc.: Kitt Peak Obs. || 
|- id="2001 FQ203" bgcolor=#E9E9E9
| 0 ||  || MBA-M || 17.80 || 1.5 km || multiple || 2001–2021 || 11 Sep 2021 || 54 || align=left | Disc.: Kitt Peak Obs. || 
|- id="2001 FR203" bgcolor=#E9E9E9
| – ||  || MBA-M || 18.5 || 1.1 km || single || 9 days || 30 Mar 2001 || 15 || align=left | Disc.: Kitt Peak Obs. || 
|- id="2001 FS203" bgcolor=#fefefe
| 1 ||  || MBA-I || 19.02 || data-sort-value="0.47" | 470 m || multiple || 2001–2021 || 28 Oct 2021 || 125 || align=left | Disc.: Kitt Peak Obs.Alt.: 2001 FK242, 2018 VK54 || 
|- id="2001 FT203" bgcolor=#fefefe
| 0 ||  || MBA-I || 18.42 || data-sort-value="0.62" | 620 m || multiple || 2001–2021 || 08 Sep 2021 || 63 || align=left | Disc.: Kitt Peak Obs.Alt.: 2014 TG66 || 
|- id="2001 FU203" bgcolor=#fefefe
| – ||  || MBA-I || 19.0 || data-sort-value="0.47" | 470 m || single || 2 days || 23 Mar 2001 || 10 || align=left | Disc.: Kitt Peak Obs. || 
|- id="2001 FV203" bgcolor=#E9E9E9
| – ||  || MBA-M || 19.1 || data-sort-value="0.64" | 640 m || single || 10 days || 31 Mar 2001 || 19 || align=left | Disc.: Kitt Peak Obs. || 
|- id="2001 FW203" bgcolor=#d6d6d6
| – ||  || MBA-O || 18.0 || 1.4 km || single || 9 days || 30 Mar 2001 || 19 || align=left | Disc.: Kitt Peak Obs. || 
|- id="2001 FX203" bgcolor=#E9E9E9
| 0 ||  || MBA-M || 18.25 || 1.2 km || multiple || 2001–2021 || 12 Nov 2021 || 41 || align=left | Disc.: Kitt Peak Obs. || 
|- id="2001 FY203" bgcolor=#fefefe
| 0 ||  || MBA-I || 18.87 || data-sort-value="0.50" | 500 m || multiple || 2001–2021 || 31 May 2021 || 89 || align=left | Disc.: Kitt Peak Obs. || 
|- id="2001 FB204" bgcolor=#E9E9E9
| – ||  || MBA-M || 19.1 || data-sort-value="0.84" | 840 m || single || 9 days || 30 Mar 2001 || 10 || align=left | Disc.: Kitt Peak Obs. || 
|- id="2001 FD204" bgcolor=#E9E9E9
| – ||  || MBA-M || 19.4 || data-sort-value="0.39" | 390 m || single || 9 days || 30 Mar 2001 || 12 || align=left | Disc.: Kitt Peak Obs. || 
|- id="2001 FF204" bgcolor=#d6d6d6
| 1 ||  || MBA-O || 17.64 || 1.5 km || multiple || 2001-2018 || 16 Jun 2018 || 27 || align=left | Disc.: Kitt Peak Obs. || 
|- id="2001 FH204" bgcolor=#E9E9E9
| – ||  || MBA-M || 18.1 || 1.3 km || single || 10 days || 31 Mar 2001 || 21 || align=left | Disc.: Kitt Peak Obs. || 
|- id="2001 FJ204" bgcolor=#E9E9E9
| – ||  || MBA-M || 19.8 || data-sort-value="0.33" | 330 m || single || 8 days || 29 Mar 2001 || 14 || align=left | Disc.: Kitt Peak Obs. || 
|- id="2001 FL204" bgcolor=#E9E9E9
| – ||  || MBA-M || 20.1 || data-sort-value="0.40" | 400 m || single || 8 days || 29 Mar 2001 || 11 || align=left | Disc.: Kitt Peak Obs. || 
|- id="2001 FN204" bgcolor=#E9E9E9
| 0 ||  || MBA-M || 17.83 || 1.5 km || multiple || 2001–2021 || 13 Sep 2021 || 59 || align=left | Disc.: Kitt Peak Obs.Alt.: 2021 PG31 || 
|- id="2001 FO204" bgcolor=#E9E9E9
| 2 ||  || MBA-M || 18.6 || data-sort-value="0.57" | 570 m || multiple || 2001–2018 || 11 Aug 2018 || 47 || align=left | Disc.: Kitt Peak Obs.Alt.: 2014 QU44 || 
|- id="2001 FQ204" bgcolor=#fefefe
| 4 ||  || MBA-I || 19.4 || data-sort-value="0.39" | 390 m || multiple || 2001–2015 || 11 Aug 2015 || 36 || align=left | Disc.: Kitt Peak Obs.Alt.: 2012 TZ272 || 
|- id="2001 FR204" bgcolor=#d6d6d6
| 0 ||  || MBA-O || 17.54 || 1.7 km || multiple || 2001–2021 || 13 May 2021 || 93 || align=left | Disc.: Kitt Peak Obs.Alt.: 2015 DN7 || 
|- id="2001 FS204" bgcolor=#E9E9E9
| – ||  || MBA-M || 18.4 || 1.2 km || single || 10 days || 31 Mar 2001 || 21 || align=left | Disc.: Kitt Peak Obs. || 
|- id="2001 FT204" bgcolor=#E9E9E9
| – ||  || MBA-M || 18.7 || data-sort-value="0.76" | 760 m || single || 11 days || 31 Mar 2001 || 20 || align=left | Disc.: Kitt Peak Obs. || 
|- id="2001 FU204" bgcolor=#d6d6d6
| – ||  || MBA-O || 17.4 || 1.8 km || single || 8 days || 29 Mar 2001 || 10 || align=left | Disc.: Kitt Peak Obs. || 
|- id="2001 FV204" bgcolor=#fefefe
| – ||  || MBA-I || 19.0 || data-sort-value="0.47" | 470 m || single || 10 days || 31 Mar 2001 || 21 || align=left | Disc.: Kitt Peak Obs. || 
|- id="2001 FY204" bgcolor=#d6d6d6
| 2 ||  || MBA-O || 17.9 || 1.5 km || multiple || 2001–2019 || 27 Oct 2019 || 28 || align=left | Disc.: Kitt Peak Obs. || 
|- id="2001 FZ204" bgcolor=#fefefe
| – ||  || MBA-I || 22.0 || data-sort-value="0.12" | 120 m || single || 2 days || 23 Mar 2001 || 10 || align=left | Disc.: Kitt Peak Obs. || 
|- id="2001 FA205" bgcolor=#E9E9E9
| 1 ||  || MBA-M || 18.47 || data-sort-value="0.60" | 600 m || multiple || 2001–2021 || 07 Apr 2021 || 40 || align=left | Disc.: Kitt Peak Obs. || 
|- id="2001 FC205" bgcolor=#E9E9E9
| 0 ||  || MBA-M || 18.15 || data-sort-value="0.99" | 990 m || multiple || 2001–2021 || 28 Nov 2021 || 73 || align=left | Disc.: Kitt Peak Obs.Alt.: 2012 TM174 || 
|- id="2001 FD205" bgcolor=#fefefe
| 0 ||  || MBA-I || 18.5 || data-sort-value="0.59" | 590 m || multiple || 2001–2019 || 03 Jul 2019 || 76 || align=left | Disc.: Kitt Peak Obs.Alt.: 2016 QU43 || 
|- id="2001 FG205" bgcolor=#d6d6d6
| 0 ||  || MBA-O || 16.96 || 2.3 km || multiple || 2001–2021 || 02 Dec 2021 || 78 || align=left | Disc.: Kitt Peak Obs. || 
|- id="2001 FH205" bgcolor=#fefefe
| – ||  || MBA-I || 19.1 || data-sort-value="0.45" | 450 m || single || 8 days || 29 Mar 2001 || 11 || align=left | Disc.: Kitt Peak Obs. || 
|- id="2001 FJ205" bgcolor=#E9E9E9
| – ||  || MBA-M || 19.5 || data-sort-value="0.37" | 370 m || single || 10 days || 31 Mar 2001 || 17 || align=left | Disc.: Kitt Peak Obs. || 
|- id="2001 FK205" bgcolor=#E9E9E9
| 0 ||  || MBA-M || 17.7 || data-sort-value="0.86" | 860 m || multiple || 1994–2019 || 15 Nov 2019 || 108 || align=left | Disc.: Kitt Peak Obs.Alt.: 2011 UX197 || 
|- id="2001 FL205" bgcolor=#d6d6d6
| – ||  || MBA-O || 16.8 || 2.4 km || single || 10 days || 31 Mar 2001 || 13 || align=left | Disc.: Kitt Peak Obs. || 
|- id="2001 FM205" bgcolor=#d6d6d6
| – ||  || MBA-O || 18.0 || 1.4 km || single || 10 days || 31 Mar 2001 || 17 || align=left | Disc.: Kitt Peak Obs. || 
|- id="2001 FN205" bgcolor=#d6d6d6
| – ||  || MBA-O || 18.5 || 1.1 km || single || 10 days || 31 Mar 2001 || 17 || align=left | Disc.: Kitt Peak Obs. || 
|- id="2001 FO205" bgcolor=#fefefe
| 0 ||  || MBA-I || 18.4 || data-sort-value="0.62" | 620 m || multiple || 2001–2019 || 28 Oct 2019 || 61 || align=left | Disc.: Kitt Peak Obs. || 
|- id="2001 FP205" bgcolor=#d6d6d6
| – ||  || MBA-O || 17.9 || 1.5 km || single || 10 days || 31 Mar 2001 || 17 || align=left | Disc.: Kitt Peak Obs. || 
|- id="2001 FQ205" bgcolor=#d6d6d6
| – ||  || MBA-O || 17.8 || 1.5 km || single || 10 days || 31 Mar 2001 || 17 || align=left | Disc.: Kitt Peak Obs. || 
|- id="2001 FR205" bgcolor=#E9E9E9
| 2 ||  || MBA-M || 18.2 || data-sort-value="0.68" | 680 m || multiple || 2001–2021 || 17 Jan 2021 || 72 || align=left | Disc.: Kitt Peak Obs.Alt.: 2013 CD200 || 
|- id="2001 FS205" bgcolor=#d6d6d6
| – ||  || MBA-O || 18.3 || 1.2 km || single || 9 days || 30 Mar 2001 || 17 || align=left | Disc.: Kitt Peak Obs. || 
|- id="2001 FT205" bgcolor=#E9E9E9
| – ||  || MBA-M || 18.2 || 1.3 km || single || 9 days || 30 Mar 2001 || 17 || align=left | Disc.: Kitt Peak Obs. || 
|- id="2001 FU205" bgcolor=#E9E9E9
| – ||  || MBA-M || 18.4 || data-sort-value="0.88" | 880 m || single || 10 days || 31 Mar 2001 || 21 || align=left | Disc.: Kitt Peak Obs. || 
|- id="2001 FW205" bgcolor=#fefefe
| – ||  || MBA-I || 19.7 || data-sort-value="0.34" | 340 m || single || 9 days || 30 Mar 2001 || 13 || align=left | Disc.: Kitt Peak Obs. || 
|- id="2001 FX205" bgcolor=#d6d6d6
| – ||  || MBA-O || 19.1 || data-sort-value="0.84" | 840 m || single || 10 days || 31 Mar 2001 || 18 || align=left | Disc.: Kitt Peak Obs. || 
|- id="2001 FY205" bgcolor=#d6d6d6
| – ||  || MBA-O || 17.8 || 1.5 km || single || 10 days || 31 Mar 2001 || 17 || align=left | Disc.: Kitt Peak Obs. || 
|- id="2001 FZ205" bgcolor=#d6d6d6
| – ||  || MBA-O || 20.6 || data-sort-value="0.42" | 420 m || single || 9 days || 30 Mar 2001 || 13 || align=left | Disc.: Kitt Peak Obs. || 
|- id="2001 FA206" bgcolor=#d6d6d6
| – ||  || MBA-O || 18.0 || 1.4 km || single || 10 days || 31 Mar 2001 || 18 || align=left | Disc.: Kitt Peak Obs. || 
|- id="2001 FB206" bgcolor=#fefefe
| – ||  || MBA-I || 19.1 || data-sort-value="0.45" | 450 m || single || 10 days || 31 Mar 2001 || 20 || align=left | Disc.: Kitt Peak Obs. || 
|- id="2001 FE206" bgcolor=#fefefe
| 0 ||  || MBA-I || 18.7 || data-sort-value="0.54" | 540 m || multiple || 2001–2020 || 07 Dec 2020 || 43 || align=left | Disc.: Kitt Peak Obs. || 
|- id="2001 FF206" bgcolor=#E9E9E9
| 0 ||  || MBA-M || 17.9 || 1.1 km || multiple || 2001–2019 || 27 Oct 2019 || 91 || align=left | Disc.: Kitt Peak Obs. || 
|- id="2001 FH206" bgcolor=#d6d6d6
| 0 ||  || MBA-O || 17.64 || 1.7 km || multiple || 2001–2019 || 05 Nov 2019 || 51 || align=left | Disc.: Kitt Peak Obs. || 
|- id="2001 FJ206" bgcolor=#E9E9E9
| 4 ||  || MBA-M || 18.5 || 1.1 km || multiple || 2001–2021 || 26 Oct 2021 || 32 || align=left | Disc.: Kitt Peak Obs. || 
|- id="2001 FK206" bgcolor=#E9E9E9
| – ||  || MBA-M || 18.6 || data-sort-value="0.80" | 800 m || single || 10 days || 31 Mar 2001 || 23 || align=left | Disc.: Kitt Peak Obs. || 
|- id="2001 FL206" bgcolor=#fefefe
| – ||  || MBA-I || 20.0 || data-sort-value="0.30" | 300 m || single || 10 days || 31 Mar 2001 || 20 || align=left | Disc.: Kitt Peak Obs. || 
|- id="2001 FN206" bgcolor=#d6d6d6
| – ||  || MBA-O || 17.0 || 2.2 km || single || 10 days || 31 Mar 2001 || 21 || align=left | Disc.: Kitt Peak Obs. || 
|- id="2001 FP206" bgcolor=#fefefe
| 0 ||  || MBA-I || 18.79 || data-sort-value="0.52" | 520 m || multiple || 2001–2021 || 05 Oct 2021 || 62 || align=left | Disc.: Kitt Peak Obs. || 
|- id="2001 FQ206" bgcolor=#d6d6d6
| – ||  || MBA-O || 19.5 || data-sort-value="0.70" | 700 m || single || 9 days || 30 Mar 2001 || 9 || align=left | Disc.: Kitt Peak Obs. || 
|- id="2001 FR206" bgcolor=#d6d6d6
| – ||  || MBA-O || 17.8 || 1.5 km || single || 10 days || 31 Mar 2001 || 17 || align=left | Disc.: Kitt Peak Obs. || 
|- id="2001 FS206" bgcolor=#d6d6d6
| – ||  || MBA-O || 19.1 || data-sort-value="0.84" | 840 m || single || 10 days || 31 Mar 2001 || 19 || align=left | Disc.: Kitt Peak Obs. || 
|- id="2001 FT206" bgcolor=#E9E9E9
| 0 ||  || MBA-M || 17.7 || 1.6 km || multiple || 2001–2021 || 06 Oct 2021 || 61 || align=left | Disc.: Kitt Peak Obs. || 
|- id="2001 FV206" bgcolor=#fefefe
| – ||  || MBA-I || 20.7 || data-sort-value="0.22" | 220 m || single || 9 days || 30 Mar 2001 || 13 || align=left | Disc.: Kitt Peak Obs. || 
|- id="2001 FW206" bgcolor=#fefefe
| – ||  || MBA-I || 20.4 || data-sort-value="0.25" | 250 m || single || 10 days || 31 Mar 2001 || 16 || align=left | Disc.: Kitt Peak Obs. || 
|- id="2001 FB207" bgcolor=#d6d6d6
| 0 ||  || MBA-O || 17.6 || 1.7 km || multiple || 2001–2021 || 08 Jun 2021 || 66 || align=left | Disc.: Kitt Peak Obs.Alt.: 2015 AA37 || 
|- id="2001 FE207" bgcolor=#d6d6d6
| 0 ||  || MBA-O || 17.07 || 2.1 km || multiple || 2001-2021 || 02 Dec 2021 || 86 || align=left | Disc.: Kitt Peak Obs.Alt.: 2015 TH186 || 
|- id="2001 FF207" bgcolor=#d6d6d6
| 2 ||  || MBA-O || 17.8 || 1.5 km || multiple || 2001–2019 || 06 Sep 2019 || 117 || align=left | Disc.: Kitt Peak Obs.Alt.: 2019 PW5 || 
|- id="2001 FG207" bgcolor=#E9E9E9
| 0 ||  || MBA-M || 18.24 || 1.3 km || multiple || 2001-2021 || 08 Nov 2021 || 68 || align=left | Disc.: Kitt Peak Obs.Alt.: 2021 KE210 || 
|- id="2001 FH207" bgcolor=#fefefe
| 0 ||  || MBA-I || 18.5 || data-sort-value="0.59" | 590 m || multiple || 2001–2020 || 18 Oct 2020 || 158 || align=left | Disc.: Kitt Peak Obs.Alt.: 2016 PC16 || 
|- id="2001 FJ207" bgcolor=#d6d6d6
| – ||  || MBA-O || 18.7 || 1.0 km || single || 10 days || 31 Mar 2001 || 18 || align=left | Disc.: Kitt Peak Obs. || 
|- id="2001 FL207" bgcolor=#fefefe
| – ||  || MBA-I || 20.3 || data-sort-value="0.26" | 260 m || single || 2 days || 23 Mar 2001 || 10 || align=left | Disc.: Kitt Peak Obs. || 
|- id="2001 FN207" bgcolor=#d6d6d6
| – ||  || MBA-O || 18.5 || 1.1 km || single || 10 days || 31 Mar 2001 || 21 || align=left | Disc.: Kitt Peak Obs. || 
|- id="2001 FO207" bgcolor=#d6d6d6
| 0 ||  || MBA-O || 17.4 || 1.8 km || multiple || 2001–2019 || 29 Sep 2019 || 35 || align=left | Disc.: Kitt Peak Obs. || 
|- id="2001 FP207" bgcolor=#fefefe
| 3 ||  || MBA-I || 19.9 || data-sort-value="0.31" | 310 m || multiple || 2001–2015 || 22 Jan 2015 || 27 || align=left | Disc.: Kitt Peak Obs.Alt.: 2015 BW474 || 
|- id="2001 FS207" bgcolor=#E9E9E9
| 0 ||  || MBA-M || 18.12 || 1.3 km || multiple || 2001–2021 || 12 Sep 2021 || 47 || align=left | Disc.: Kitt Peak Obs. || 
|- id="2001 FU207" bgcolor=#C2FFFF
| – ||  || JT || 15.7 || 4.0 km || single || 10 days || 31 Mar 2001 || 21 || align=left | Disc.: Kitt Peak Obs.Greek camp (L4) || 
|- id="2001 FW207" bgcolor=#E9E9E9
| – ||  || MBA-M || 19.1 || data-sort-value="0.84" | 840 m || single || 10 days || 31 Mar 2001 || 21 || align=left | Disc.: Kitt Peak Obs. || 
|- id="2001 FX207" bgcolor=#E9E9E9
| – ||  || MBA-M || 18.7 || 1.0 km || single || 9 days || 30 Mar 2001 || 10 || align=left | Disc.: Kitt Peak Obs. || 
|- id="2001 FY207" bgcolor=#E9E9E9
| 2 ||  || MBA-M || 18.9 || data-sort-value="0.49" | 490 m || multiple || 2001–2018 || 09 Jul 2018 || 39 || align=left | Disc.: Kitt Peak Obs.Alt.: 2014 QM102 || 
|- id="2001 FZ207" bgcolor=#d6d6d6
| – ||  || MBA-O || 18.4 || 1.2 km || single || 2 days || 23 Mar 2001 || 10 || align=left | Disc.: Kitt Peak Obs. || 
|- id="2001 FA208" bgcolor=#E9E9E9
| – ||  || MBA-M || 18.6 || 1.1 km || single || 10 days || 31 Mar 2001 || 21 || align=left | Disc.: Kitt Peak Obs. || 
|- id="2001 FB208" bgcolor=#fefefe
| – ||  || MBA-I || 19.8 || data-sort-value="0.33" | 330 m || single || 9 days || 30 Mar 2001 || 13 || align=left | Disc.: Kitt Peak Obs. || 
|- id="2001 FC208" bgcolor=#fefefe
| 0 ||  || MBA-I || 18.3 || data-sort-value="0.65" | 650 m || multiple || 2001–2020 || 20 Oct 2020 || 103 || align=left | Disc.: Kitt Peak Obs.Alt.: 2002 TM150 || 
|- id="2001 FD208" bgcolor=#d6d6d6
| – ||  || MBA-O || 18.5 || 1.1 km || single || 8 days || 29 Mar 2001 || 13 || align=left | Disc.: Kitt Peak Obs. || 
|- id="2001 FE208" bgcolor=#d6d6d6
| – ||  || MBA-O || 18.6 || 1.1 km || single || 10 days || 31 Mar 2001 || 17 || align=left | Disc.: Kitt Peak Obs. || 
|- id="2001 FF208" bgcolor=#d6d6d6
| 0 ||  || MBA-O || 18.5 || 1.1 km || multiple || 2001–2016 || 03 May 2016 || 36 || align=left | Disc.: Kitt Peak Obs.Alt.: 2003 SP424 || 
|- id="2001 FH208" bgcolor=#fefefe
| – ||  || MBA-I || 20.5 || data-sort-value="0.24" | 240 m || single || 10 days || 31 Mar 2001 || 21 || align=left | Disc.: Kitt Peak Obs. || 
|- id="2001 FJ208" bgcolor=#E9E9E9
| 1 ||  || MBA-M || 18.01 || 1.3 km || multiple || 2001-2022 || 30 Aug 2022 || 49 || align=left | Disc.: Kitt Peak Obs. || 
|- id="2001 FK208" bgcolor=#E9E9E9
| – ||  || MBA-M || 19.9 || data-sort-value="0.31" | 310 m || single || 8 days || 29 Mar 2001 || 14 || align=left | Disc.: Kitt Peak Obs. || 
|- id="2001 FL208" bgcolor=#fefefe
| 0 ||  || MBA-I || 18.63 || data-sort-value="0.57" | 570 m || multiple || 2001-2022 || 07 Jan 2022 || 74 || align=left | Disc.: Kitt Peak Obs.Alt.: 2015 BG165 || 
|- id="2001 FM208" bgcolor=#E9E9E9
| 0 ||  || MBA-M || 17.67 || 1.6 km || multiple || 2001–2021 || 08 Sep 2021 || 56 || align=left | Disc.: Kitt Peak Obs. || 
|- id="2001 FN208" bgcolor=#fefefe
| – ||  || MBA-I || 21.1 || data-sort-value="0.18" | 180 m || single || 9 days || 30 Mar 2001 || 10 || align=left | Disc.: Kitt Peak Obs. || 
|- id="2001 FO208" bgcolor=#fefefe
| – ||  || MBA-I || 20.6 || data-sort-value="0.23" | 230 m || single || 9 days || 30 Mar 2001 || 13 || align=left | Disc.: Kitt Peak Obs. || 
|- id="2001 FP208" bgcolor=#E9E9E9
| 0 ||  || MBA-M || 18.22 || 1.3 km || multiple || 2001-2022 || 26 Nov 2022 || 43 || align=left | Disc.: Kitt Peak Obs. || 
|- id="2001 FQ208" bgcolor=#E9E9E9
| 0 ||  || MBA-M || 17.80 || 1.5 km || multiple || 2001–2021 || 30 Nov 2021 || 66 || align=left | Disc.: Kitt Peak Obs. || 
|- id="2001 FR208" bgcolor=#d6d6d6
| – ||  || MBA-O || 18.6 || 1.1 km || single || 10 days || 31 Mar 2001 || 15 || align=left | Disc.: Kitt Peak Obs. || 
|- id="2001 FV208" bgcolor=#d6d6d6
| – ||  || MBA-O || 18.8 || data-sort-value="0.97" | 970 m || single || 10 days || 31 Mar 2001 || 21 || align=left | Disc.: Kitt Peak Obs. || 
|- id="2001 FW208" bgcolor=#d6d6d6
| – ||  || MBA-O || 18.0 || 1.4 km || single || 9 days || 30 Mar 2001 || 16 || align=left | Disc.: Kitt Peak Obs. || 
|- id="2001 FX208" bgcolor=#fefefe
| 0 ||  || MBA-I || 17.93 || data-sort-value="0.77" | 770 m || multiple || 2001–2021 || 09 Dec 2021 || 182 || align=left | Disc.: Kitt Peak Obs. || 
|- id="2001 FZ208" bgcolor=#d6d6d6
| – ||  || MBA-O || 18.8 || data-sort-value="0.97" | 970 m || single || 2 days || 23 Mar 2001 || 10 || align=left | Disc.: Kitt Peak Obs. || 
|- id="2001 FB209" bgcolor=#E9E9E9
| – ||  || MBA-M || 18.5 || 1.1 km || single || 10 days || 31 Mar 2001 || 14 || align=left | Disc.: Kitt Peak Obs. || 
|- id="2001 FC209" bgcolor=#d6d6d6
| – ||  || MBA-O || 17.4 || 1.8 km || single || 2 days || 23 Mar 2001 || 10 || align=left | Disc.: Kitt Peak Obs. || 
|- id="2001 FD209" bgcolor=#FA8072
| 0 ||  || MCA || 19.14 || data-sort-value="0.44" | 440 m || multiple || 2001–2021 || 26 Nov 2021 || 61 || align=left | Disc.: Kitt Peak Obs.Alt.: 2014 HN46 || 
|- id="2001 FF209" bgcolor=#d6d6d6
| 0 ||  || MBA-O || 17.54 || 1.7 km || multiple || 2001–2021 || 28 Nov 2021 || 34 || align=left | Disc.: Kitt Peak Obs. || 
|- id="2001 FG209" bgcolor=#fefefe
| 0 ||  || MBA-I || 19.0 || data-sort-value="0.47" | 470 m || multiple || 2001–2020 || 23 Jun 2020 || 63 || align=left | Disc.: Kitt Peak Obs.Alt.: 2016 GZ55 || 
|- id="2001 FJ209" bgcolor=#E9E9E9
| 5 ||  || MBA-M || 18.7 || 1.0 km || multiple || 2001–2019 || 07 Apr 2019 || 39 || align=left | Disc.: Kitt Peak Obs.Alt.: 2019 FW21 || 
|- id="2001 FK209" bgcolor=#d6d6d6
| – ||  || MBA-O || 18.5 || 1.1 km || single || 10 days || 31 Mar 2001 || 21 || align=left | Disc.: Kitt Peak Obs. || 
|- id="2001 FL209" bgcolor=#E9E9E9
| – ||  || MBA-M || 18.4 || 1.2 km || single || 10 days || 31 Mar 2001 || 15 || align=left | Disc.: Kitt Peak Obs. || 
|- id="2001 FN209" bgcolor=#fefefe
| – ||  || MBA-I || 20.8 || data-sort-value="0.21" | 210 m || single || 8 days || 29 Mar 2001 || 14 || align=left | Disc.: Kitt Peak Obs. || 
|- id="2001 FO209" bgcolor=#E9E9E9
| – ||  || MBA-M || 18.8 || data-sort-value="0.73" | 730 m || single || 10 days || 31 Mar 2001 || 21 || align=left | Disc.: Kitt Peak Obs. || 
|- id="2001 FP209" bgcolor=#E9E9E9
| – ||  || MBA-M || 18.9 || data-sort-value="0.49" | 490 m || single || 10 days || 31 Mar 2001 || 15 || align=left | Disc.: Kitt Peak Obs. || 
|- id="2001 FQ209" bgcolor=#E9E9E9
| 1 ||  || MBA-M || 18.1 || 1.0 km || multiple || 2001–2019 || 03 Jul 2019 || 43 || align=left | Disc.: Kitt Peak Obs.Alt.: 2015 PX277 || 
|- id="2001 FR209" bgcolor=#d6d6d6
| – ||  || MBA-O || 18.6 || 1.1 km || single || 8 days || 29 Mar 2001 || 10 || align=left | Disc.: Kitt Peak Obs. || 
|- id="2001 FT209" bgcolor=#fefefe
| – ||  || MBA-I || 20.8 || data-sort-value="0.21" | 210 m || single || 9 days || 30 Mar 2001 || 17 || align=left | Disc.: Kitt Peak Obs. || 
|- id="2001 FU209" bgcolor=#d6d6d6
| – ||  || MBA-O || 18.2 || 1.3 km || single || 2 days || 23 Mar 2001 || 10 || align=left | Disc.: Kitt Peak Obs. || 
|- id="2001 FW209" bgcolor=#E9E9E9
| – ||  || MBA-M || 18.4 || 1.2 km || single || 10 days || 31 Mar 2001 || 17 || align=left | Disc.: Kitt Peak Obs. || 
|- id="2001 FX209" bgcolor=#d6d6d6
| – ||  || MBA-O || 18.3 || 1.2 km || single || 8 days || 29 Mar 2001 || 13 || align=left | Disc.: Kitt Peak Obs. || 
|- id="2001 FZ209" bgcolor=#d6d6d6
| – ||  || MBA-O || 18.8 || data-sort-value="0.97" | 970 m || single || 10 days || 31 Mar 2001 || 17 || align=left | Disc.: Kitt Peak Obs. || 
|- id="2001 FA210" bgcolor=#d6d6d6
| 5 ||  || MBA-O || 17.5 || 1.8 km || multiple || 2001–2017 || 19 Mar 2017 || 26 || align=left | Disc.: Kitt Peak Obs.Alt.: 2017 FG33 || 
|- id="2001 FB210" bgcolor=#d6d6d6
| – ||  || MBA-O || 18.6 || 1.1 km || single || 9 days || 30 Mar 2001 || 17 || align=left | Disc.: Kitt Peak Obs. || 
|- id="2001 FC210" bgcolor=#fefefe
| – ||  || MBA-I || 19.2 || data-sort-value="0.43" | 430 m || single || 2 days || 23 Mar 2001 || 10 || align=left | Disc.: Kitt Peak Obs. || 
|- id="2001 FD210" bgcolor=#d6d6d6
| – ||  || MBA-O || 18.4 || 1.2 km || single || 10 days || 31 Mar 2001 || 18 || align=left | Disc.: Kitt Peak Obs. || 
|- id="2001 FF210" bgcolor=#fefefe
| – ||  || MBA-I || 20.1 || data-sort-value="0.28" | 280 m || single || 8 days || 29 Mar 2001 || 11 || align=left | Disc.: Kitt Peak Obs. || 
|- id="2001 FG210" bgcolor=#E9E9E9
| – ||  || MBA-M || 19.5 || data-sort-value="0.37" | 370 m || single || 2 days || 23 Mar 2001 || 10 || align=left | Disc.: Kitt Peak Obs. || 
|- id="2001 FH210" bgcolor=#E9E9E9
| – ||  || MBA-M || 18.3 || data-sort-value="0.92" | 920 m || single || 10 days || 31 Mar 2001 || 17 || align=left | Disc.: Kitt Peak Obs. || 
|- id="2001 FJ210" bgcolor=#d6d6d6
| – ||  || MBA-O || 19.6 || data-sort-value="0.67" | 670 m || single || 10 days || 31 Mar 2001 || 11 || align=left | Disc.: Kitt Peak Obs. || 
|- id="2001 FK210" bgcolor=#E9E9E9
| – ||  || MBA-M || 21.3 || data-sort-value="0.23" | 230 m || single || 9 days || 30 Mar 2001 || 17 || align=left | Disc.: Kitt Peak Obs. || 
|- id="2001 FM210" bgcolor=#E9E9E9
| – ||  || MBA-M || 19.4 || data-sort-value="0.73" | 730 m || single || 10 days || 31 Mar 2001 || 18 || align=left | Disc.: Kitt Peak Obs. || 
|- id="2001 FN210" bgcolor=#d6d6d6
| – ||  || MBA-O || 19.8 || data-sort-value="0.61" | 610 m || single || 8 days || 29 Mar 2001 || 13 || align=left | Disc.: Kitt Peak Obs. || 
|- id="2001 FR210" bgcolor=#E9E9E9
| – ||  || MBA-M || 18.5 || data-sort-value="0.84" | 840 m || single || 9 days || 30 Mar 2001 || 10 || align=left | Disc.: Kitt Peak Obs. || 
|- id="2001 FS210" bgcolor=#d6d6d6
| 0 ||  || MBA-O || 17.1 || 2.1 km || multiple || 2001–2018 || 12 Feb 2018 || 82 || align=left | Disc.: Kitt Peak Obs.Alt.: 2016 UE120 || 
|- id="2001 FU210" bgcolor=#d6d6d6
| – ||  || MBA-O || 18.6 || 1.1 km || single || 10 days || 31 Mar 2001 || 17 || align=left | Disc.: Kitt Peak Obs. || 
|- id="2001 FV210" bgcolor=#E9E9E9
| – ||  || MBA-M || 18.7 || data-sort-value="0.76" | 760 m || single || 10 days || 31 Mar 2001 || 20 || align=left | Disc.: Kitt Peak Obs. || 
|- id="2001 FW210" bgcolor=#d6d6d6
| – ||  || MBA-O || 18.9 || data-sort-value="0.92" | 920 m || single || 10 days || 31 Mar 2001 || 17 || align=left | Disc.: Kitt Peak Obs. || 
|- id="2001 FX210" bgcolor=#E9E9E9
| 0 ||  || MBA-M || 18.0 || 1.1 km || multiple || 2001–2020 || 10 Dec 2020 || 69 || align=left | Disc.: Kitt Peak Obs.Alt.: 2007 VB196, 2011 SL305 || 
|- id="2001 FY210" bgcolor=#d6d6d6
| – ||  || MBA-O || 18.2 || 1.3 km || single || 10 days || 31 Mar 2001 || 17 || align=left | Disc.: Kitt Peak Obs. || 
|- id="2001 FZ210" bgcolor=#E9E9E9
| – ||  || MBA-M || 20.1 || data-sort-value="0.28" | 280 m || single || 10 days || 31 Mar 2001 || 24 || align=left | Disc.: Kitt Peak Obs. || 
|- id="2001 FA211" bgcolor=#FA8072
| – ||  || MCA || 21.8 || data-sort-value="0.13" | 130 m || single || 10 days || 31 Mar 2001 || 10 || align=left | Disc.: Kitt Peak Obs. || 
|- id="2001 FE211" bgcolor=#E9E9E9
| – ||  || MBA-M || 20.9 || data-sort-value="0.37" | 370 m || single || 2 days || 23 Mar 2001 || 10 || align=left | Disc.: Kitt Peak Obs. || 
|- id="2001 FF211" bgcolor=#E9E9E9
| 1 ||  || MBA-M || 18.0 || 1.1 km || multiple || 2001–2019 || 02 Jul 2019 || 48 || align=left | Disc.: Kitt Peak Obs. || 
|- id="2001 FG211" bgcolor=#d6d6d6
| – ||  || MBA-O || 18.0 || 1.4 km || single || 9 days || 30 Mar 2001 || 13 || align=left | Disc.: Kitt Peak Obs. || 
|- id="2001 FH211" bgcolor=#E9E9E9
| – ||  || MBA-M || 19.0 || data-sort-value="0.67" | 670 m || single || 9 days || 30 Mar 2001 || 17 || align=left | Disc.: Kitt Peak Obs. || 
|- id="2001 FJ211" bgcolor=#E9E9E9
| 0 ||  || MBA-M || 18.3 || data-sort-value="0.65" | 650 m || multiple || 2001–2021 || 23 Jan 2021 || 71 || align=left | Disc.: Kitt Peak Obs.Alt.: 2009 DD30 || 
|- id="2001 FK211" bgcolor=#d6d6d6
| – ||  || MBA-O || 18.6 || 1.1 km || single || 10 days || 31 Mar 2001 || 17 || align=left | Disc.: Kitt Peak Obs. || 
|- id="2001 FM211" bgcolor=#d6d6d6
| 2 ||  || MBA-O || 18.44 || 1.1 km || multiple || 2001–2021 || 30 May 2021 || 37 || align=left | Disc.: Kitt Peak Obs. || 
|- id="2001 FN211" bgcolor=#d6d6d6
| 0 ||  || MBA-O || 16.82 || 2.4 km || multiple || 2001–2021 || 27 Nov 2021 || 81 || align=left | Disc.: Kitt Peak Obs. || 
|- id="2001 FP211" bgcolor=#d6d6d6
| 0 ||  || MBA-O || 17.18 || 1.8 km || multiple || 2001-2021 || 31 Oct 2021 || 82 || align=left | Disc.: Kitt Peak Obs.Alt.: 2015 TW427 || 
|- id="2001 FQ211" bgcolor=#E9E9E9
| – ||  || MBA-M || 18.2 || 1.4 km || single || 10 days || 31 Mar 2001 || 21 || align=left | Disc.: Kitt Peak Obs. || 
|- id="2001 FR211" bgcolor=#d6d6d6
| – ||  || MBA-O || 18.0 || 1.4 km || single || 10 days || 31 Mar 2001 || 11 || align=left | Disc.: Kitt Peak Obs. || 
|- id="2001 FS211" bgcolor=#E9E9E9
| – ||  || MBA-M || 18.9 || data-sort-value="0.49" | 490 m || single || 10 days || 31 Mar 2001 || 17 || align=left | Disc.: Kitt Peak Obs. || 
|- id="2001 FT211" bgcolor=#fefefe
| – ||  || MBA-I || 20.2 || data-sort-value="0.27" | 270 m || single || 10 days || 31 Mar 2001 || 17 || align=left | Disc.: Kitt Peak Obs. || 
|- id="2001 FU211" bgcolor=#d6d6d6
| – ||  || MBA-O || 18.5 || 1.1 km || single || 10 days || 31 Mar 2001 || 13 || align=left | Disc.: Kitt Peak Obs. || 
|- id="2001 FV211" bgcolor=#E9E9E9
| 0 ||  || MBA-M || 17.69 || 1.6 km || multiple || 2001–2021 || 07 Sep 2021 || 72 || align=left | Disc.: Kitt Peak Obs. || 
|- id="2001 FW211" bgcolor=#d6d6d6
| – ||  || MBA-O || 18.3 || 1.2 km || single || 10 days || 31 Mar 2001 || 14 || align=left | Disc.: Kitt Peak Obs. || 
|- id="2001 FZ211" bgcolor=#E9E9E9
| 1 ||  || MBA-M || 17.6 || data-sort-value="0.90" | 900 m || multiple || 2001–2019 || 19 Dec 2019 || 41 || align=left | Disc.: Kitt Peak Obs. || 
|- id="2001 FB212" bgcolor=#fefefe
| 0 ||  || MBA-I || 18.7 || data-sort-value="0.54" | 540 m || multiple || 2001–2019 || 28 Dec 2019 || 40 || align=left | Disc.: Kitt Peak Obs. || 
|- id="2001 FC212" bgcolor=#E9E9E9
| – ||  || MBA-M || 19.3 || data-sort-value="0.77" | 770 m || single || 10 days || 31 Mar 2001 || 18 || align=left | Disc.: Kitt Peak Obs. || 
|- id="2001 FD212" bgcolor=#fefefe
| 0 ||  || MBA-I || 18.2 || data-sort-value="0.68" | 680 m || multiple || 2001–2020 || 08 Dec 2020 || 107 || align=left | Disc.: Kitt Peak Obs. || 
|- id="2001 FE212" bgcolor=#E9E9E9
| – ||  || MBA-M || 19.7 || data-sort-value="0.48" | 480 m || single || 10 days || 31 Mar 2001 || 14 || align=left | Disc.: Kitt Peak Obs. || 
|- id="2001 FG212" bgcolor=#fefefe
| – ||  || MBA-I || 20.0 || data-sort-value="0.30" | 300 m || single || 9 days || 30 Mar 2001 || 17 || align=left | Disc.: Kitt Peak Obs. || 
|- id="2001 FL212" bgcolor=#d6d6d6
| 7 ||  || MBA-O || 17.6 || 1.7 km || single || 10 days || 31 Mar 2001 || 14 || align=left | Disc.: Kitt Peak Obs. || 
|- id="2001 FN212" bgcolor=#d6d6d6
| 3 ||  || MBA-O || 18.13 || 1.2 km || multiple || 2001-2022 || 25 Apr 2022 || 36 || align=left | Disc.: Kitt Peak Obs. Alt.: 2022 FK13 || 
|- id="2001 FP212" bgcolor=#d6d6d6
| – ||  || MBA-O || 18.6 || 1.1 km || single || 10 days || 31 Mar 2001 || 17 || align=left | Disc.: Kitt Peak Obs. || 
|- id="2001 FQ212" bgcolor=#E9E9E9
| – ||  || MBA-M || 20.1 || data-sort-value="0.28" | 280 m || single || 9 days || 30 Mar 2001 || 10 || align=left | Disc.: Kitt Peak Obs. || 
|- id="2001 FR212" bgcolor=#d6d6d6
| – ||  || MBA-O || 19.1 || data-sort-value="0.84" | 840 m || single || 10 days || 31 Mar 2001 || 21 || align=left | Disc.: Kitt Peak Obs. || 
|- id="2001 FS212" bgcolor=#fefefe
| 0 ||  || MBA-I || 18.5 || data-sort-value="0.59" | 590 m || multiple || 2001–2020 || 20 Oct 2020 || 84 || align=left | Disc.: Kitt Peak Obs. || 
|- id="2001 FU212" bgcolor=#d6d6d6
| – ||  || MBA-O || 18.9 || data-sort-value="0.92" | 920 m || single || 10 days || 31 Mar 2001 || 18 || align=left | Disc.: Kitt Peak Obs. || 
|- id="2001 FV212" bgcolor=#d6d6d6
| – ||  || MBA-O || 18.9 || data-sort-value="0.92" | 920 m || single || 10 days || 31 Mar 2001 || 21 || align=left | Disc.: Kitt Peak Obs. || 
|- id="2001 FW212" bgcolor=#d6d6d6
| – ||  || HIL || 17.8 || 1.5 km || single || 10 days || 31 Mar 2001 || 18 || align=left | Disc.: Kitt Peak Obs. || 
|- id="2001 FX212" bgcolor=#E9E9E9
| – ||  || MBA-M || 18.9 || data-sort-value="0.70" | 700 m || single || 10 days || 31 Mar 2001 || 19 || align=left | Disc.: Kitt Peak Obs. || 
|- id="2001 FY212" bgcolor=#E9E9E9
| – ||  || MBA-M || 19.3 || data-sort-value="0.41" | 410 m || single || 8 days || 29 Mar 2001 || 10 || align=left | Disc.: Kitt Peak Obs. || 
|- id="2001 FZ212" bgcolor=#fefefe
| 2 ||  || MBA-I || 18.9 || data-sort-value="0.49" | 490 m || multiple || 2001–2017 || 09 Dec 2017 || 41 || align=left | Disc.: Kitt Peak Obs. || 
|- id="2001 FA213" bgcolor=#E9E9E9
| – ||  || MBA-M || 19.7 || data-sort-value="0.34" | 340 m || single || 4 days || 25 Mar 2001 || 7 || align=left | Disc.: Kitt Peak Obs. || 
|- id="2001 FB213" bgcolor=#d6d6d6
| – ||  || MBA-O || 18.2 || 1.3 km || single || 2 days || 23 Mar 2001 || 10 || align=left | Disc.: Kitt Peak Obs. || 
|- id="2001 FC213" bgcolor=#E9E9E9
| – ||  || MBA-M || 18.7 || data-sort-value="0.76" | 760 m || single || 4 days || 25 Mar 2001 || 12 || align=left | Disc.: Kitt Peak Obs. || 
|- id="2001 FD213" bgcolor=#d6d6d6
| – ||  || MBA-O || 19.5 || data-sort-value="0.70" | 700 m || single || 4 days || 25 Mar 2001 || 12 || align=left | Disc.: Kitt Peak Obs. || 
|- id="2001 FE213" bgcolor=#E9E9E9
| 5 ||  || MBA-M || 19.49 || data-sort-value="0.41" | 380 m || multiple || 2001-2019  || 29 Sep 2019 || 109 || align=left | Disc.: Kitt Peak Obs. Alt.: 2019 SN186 || 
|- id="2001 FF213" bgcolor=#E9E9E9
| – ||  || MBA-M || 18.9 || data-sort-value="0.92" | 920 m || single || 10 days || 31 Mar 2001 || 23 || align=left | Disc.: Kitt Peak Obs. || 
|- id="2001 FH213" bgcolor=#FA8072
| – ||  || MCA || 19.2 || data-sort-value="0.43" | 430 m || single || 2 days || 23 Mar 2001 || 10 || align=left | Disc.: Kitt Peak Obs. || 
|- id="2001 FK213" bgcolor=#E9E9E9
| – ||  || MBA-M || 17.2 || 2.0 km || single || 2 days || 23 Mar 2001 || 10 || align=left | Disc.: Kitt Peak Obs. || 
|- id="2001 FL213" bgcolor=#E9E9E9
| – ||  || MBA-M || 17.6 || 1.3 km || single || 10 days || 31 Mar 2001 || 16 || align=left | Disc.: Kitt Peak Obs. || 
|- id="2001 FN213" bgcolor=#d6d6d6
| – ||  || MBA-O || 17.1 || 2.1 km || single || 10 days || 31 Mar 2001 || 20 || align=left | Disc.: Kitt Peak Obs. || 
|- id="2001 FO213" bgcolor=#fefefe
| – ||  || MBA-I || 20.2 || data-sort-value="0.27" | 270 m || single || 10 days || 31 Mar 2001 || 21 || align=left | Disc.: Kitt Peak Obs. || 
|- id="2001 FP213" bgcolor=#d6d6d6
| – ||  || MBA-O || 18.4 || 1.2 km || single || 10 days || 31 Mar 2001 || 21 || align=left | Disc.: Kitt Peak Obs. || 
|- id="2001 FQ213" bgcolor=#d6d6d6
| 0 ||  || MBA-O || 17.64 || 1.7 km || multiple || 2001–2022 || 25 Jan 2022 || 67 || align=left | Disc.: Kitt Peak Obs.Alt.: 2014 RQ51 || 
|- id="2001 FR213" bgcolor=#d6d6d6
| – ||  || MBA-O || 19.0 || data-sort-value="0.88" | 880 m || single || 4 days || 25 Mar 2001 || 12 || align=left | Disc.: Kitt Peak Obs. || 
|- id="2001 FS213" bgcolor=#d6d6d6
| – ||  || MBA-O || 18.3 || 1.2 km || single || 10 days || 31 Mar 2001 || 16 || align=left | Disc.: Kitt Peak Obs. || 
|- id="2001 FU213" bgcolor=#E9E9E9
| – ||  || MBA-M || 19.0 || data-sort-value="0.88" | 880 m || single || 10 days || 31 Mar 2001 || 14 || align=left | Disc.: Kitt Peak Obs. || 
|- id="2001 FV213" bgcolor=#fefefe
| – ||  || MBA-I || 20.5 || data-sort-value="0.24" | 240 m || single || 9 days || 30 Mar 2001 || 17 || align=left | Disc.: Kitt Peak Obs. || 
|- id="2001 FW213" bgcolor=#d6d6d6
| – ||  || MBA-O || 18.2 || 1.3 km || single || 10 days || 31 Mar 2001 || 20 || align=left | Disc.: Kitt Peak Obs. || 
|- id="2001 FX213" bgcolor=#d6d6d6
| 0 ||  || MBA-O || 17.26 || 2 km || multiple || 2001-2020 || 10 Nov 2020 || 98 || align=left | Disc.: Kitt Peak Obs.Alt.: 2017 DO85 || 
|- id="2001 FY213" bgcolor=#fefefe
| – ||  || MBA-I || 20.2 || data-sort-value="0.27" | 270 m || single || 10 days || 31 Mar 2001 || 19 || align=left | Disc.: Kitt Peak Obs. || 
|- id="2001 FZ213" bgcolor=#E9E9E9
| – ||  || MBA-M || 19.2 || data-sort-value="0.43" | 430 m || single || 10 days || 31 Mar 2001 || 21 || align=left | Disc.: Kitt Peak Obs. || 
|- id="2001 FA214" bgcolor=#E9E9E9
| – ||  || MBA-M || 19.0 || data-sort-value="0.67" | 670 m || single || 10 days || 31 Mar 2001 || 21 || align=left | Disc.: Kitt Peak Obs. || 
|- id="2001 FB214" bgcolor=#d6d6d6
| 2 ||  || MBA-O || 17.5 || 1.8 km || multiple || 2001–2019 || 22 Oct 2019 || 42 || align=left | Disc.: Kitt Peak Obs. || 
|- id="2001 FE214" bgcolor=#fefefe
| 4 ||  || MBA-I || 20.25 || data-sort-value="0.17" | 270 m || multiple || 2001-2022 || 16 Nov 2022 || 26 || align=left | Disc.: Kitt Peak Obs. || 
|- id="2001 FF214" bgcolor=#E9E9E9
| 0 ||  || MBA-M || 17.8 || data-sort-value="0.82" | 820 m || multiple || 2001–2019 || 28 Oct 2019 || 87 || align=left | Disc.: Kitt Peak Obs.Alt.: 2014 MN1 || 
|- id="2001 FH214" bgcolor=#fefefe
| 3 ||  || MBA-I || 19.5 || data-sort-value="0.37" | 370 m || multiple || 2001–2019 || 03 Dec 2019 || 31 || align=left | Disc.: Kitt Peak Obs. || 
|- id="2001 FJ214" bgcolor=#d6d6d6
| – ||  || MBA-O || 16.2 || 3.2 km || single || 10 days || 31 Mar 2001 || 10 || align=left | Disc.: Kitt Peak Obs. || 
|- id="2001 FL214" bgcolor=#d6d6d6
| – ||  || MBA-O || 18.8 || data-sort-value="0.97" | 970 m || single || 10 days || 31 Mar 2001 || 16 || align=left | Disc.: Kitt Peak Obs. || 
|- id="2001 FM214" bgcolor=#d6d6d6
| 2 ||  || MBA-O || 17.51 || 1.8 km || multiple || 2001–2021 || 26 Nov 2021 || 38 || align=left | Disc.: Kitt Peak Obs.Alt.: 2020 PM49 || 
|- id="2001 FN214" bgcolor=#E9E9E9
| 3 ||  || MBA-M || 18.1 || 1.3 km || multiple || 2001–2020 || 14 Aug 2020 || 39 || align=left | Disc.: Kitt Peak Obs. || 
|- id="2001 FO214" bgcolor=#d6d6d6
| – ||  || MBA-O || 16.8 || 2.4 km || single || 8 days || 29 Mar 2001 || 10 || align=left | Disc.: Kitt Peak Obs. || 
|- id="2001 FP214" bgcolor=#E9E9E9
| 0 ||  || MBA-M || 17.8 || 1.2 km || multiple || 2001–2021 || 06 Jan 2021 || 109 || align=left | Disc.: Kitt Peak Obs.Alt.: 2020 PN26 || 
|- id="2001 FQ214" bgcolor=#E9E9E9
| – ||  || MBA-M || 19.4 || data-sort-value="0.55" | 550 m || single || 10 days || 31 Mar 2001 || 20 || align=left | Disc.: Kitt Peak Obs. || 
|- id="2001 FR214" bgcolor=#d6d6d6
| 0 ||  || MBA-O || 17.6 || 1.7 km || multiple || 2001–2019 || 28 Dec 2019 || 52 || align=left | Disc.: Kitt Peak Obs.Alt.: 2003 UV346 || 
|- id="2001 FT214" bgcolor=#d6d6d6
| 1 ||  || MBA-O || 17.29 || 1.9 km || multiple || 2001–2021 || 28 Oct 2021 || 52 || align=left | Disc.: Kitt Peak Obs.Alt.: 2021 PR30 || 
|- id="2001 FU214" bgcolor=#E9E9E9
| – ||  || MBA-M || 20.6 || data-sort-value="0.23" | 230 m || single || 10 days || 31 Mar 2001 || 14 || align=left | Disc.: Kitt Peak Obs. || 
|- id="2001 FV214" bgcolor=#E9E9E9
| – ||  || MBA-M || 19.0 || data-sort-value="0.88" | 880 m || single || 8 days || 29 Mar 2001 || 9 || align=left | Disc.: Kitt Peak Obs. || 
|- id="2001 FW214" bgcolor=#d6d6d6
| – ||  || MBA-O || 19.1 || data-sort-value="0.84" | 840 m || single || 10 days || 31 Mar 2001 || 10 || align=left | Disc.: Kitt Peak Obs. || 
|- id="2001 FX214" bgcolor=#E9E9E9
| – ||  || MBA-M || 19.5 || data-sort-value="0.37" | 370 m || single || 10 days || 31 Mar 2001 || 20 || align=left | Disc.: Kitt Peak Obs. || 
|- id="2001 FY214" bgcolor=#E9E9E9
| 6 ||  || MBA-M || 19.3 || data-sort-value="0.58" | 580 m || multiple || 2001–2014 || 25 Apr 2014 || 18 || align=left | Disc.: Kitt Peak Obs. || 
|- id="2001 FZ214" bgcolor=#fefefe
| – ||  || MBA-I || 19.8 || data-sort-value="0.33" | 330 m || single || 10 days || 31 Mar 2001 || 17 || align=left | Disc.: Kitt Peak Obs. || 
|- id="2001 FA215" bgcolor=#E9E9E9
| 0 ||  || MBA-M || 17.5 || 1.3 km || multiple || 2001–2020 || 11 Dec 2020 || 136 || align=left | Disc.: Kitt Peak Obs.Alt.: 2009 BJ140, 2013 BY90 || 
|- id="2001 FB215" bgcolor=#fefefe
| – ||  || MBA-I || 19.3 || data-sort-value="0.41" | 410 m || single || 10 days || 31 Mar 2001 || 11 || align=left | Disc.: Kitt Peak Obs. || 
|- id="2001 FC215" bgcolor=#E9E9E9
| – ||  || MBA-M || 19.2 || data-sort-value="0.43" | 430 m || single || 10 days || 31 Mar 2001 || 14 || align=left | Disc.: Kitt Peak Obs. || 
|- id="2001 FE215" bgcolor=#E9E9E9
| – ||  || MBA-M || 18.1 || data-sort-value="0.71" | 710 m || single || 10 days || 31 Mar 2001 || 20 || align=left | Disc.: Kitt Peak Obs. || 
|- id="2001 FG215" bgcolor=#d6d6d6
| – ||  || MBA-O || 17.6 || 1.7 km || single || 10 days || 31 Mar 2001 || 17 || align=left | Disc.: Kitt Peak Obs. || 
|- id="2001 FH215" bgcolor=#d6d6d6
| 0 ||  || MBA-O || 17.2 || 2.0 km || multiple || 2001–2019 || 28 Nov 2019 || 87 || align=left | Disc.: Kitt Peak Obs.Alt.: 2014 WV16 || 
|- id="2001 FJ215" bgcolor=#fefefe
| – ||  || MBA-I || 22.4 || data-sort-value="0.098" | 98 m || single || 10 days || 31 Mar 2001 || 9 || align=left | Disc.: Kitt Peak Obs. || 
|- id="2001 FK215" bgcolor=#E9E9E9
| 0 ||  || MBA-M || 17.7 || 1.2 km || multiple || 2001–2020 || 16 Aug 2020 || 38 || align=left | Disc.: Kitt Peak Obs. || 
|- id="2001 FL215" bgcolor=#fefefe
| – ||  || MBA-I || 20.1 || data-sort-value="0.28" | 280 m || single || 10 days || 31 Mar 2001 || 24 || align=left | Disc.: Kitt Peak Obs. || 
|- id="2001 FM215" bgcolor=#fefefe
| – ||  || MBA-I || 19.4 || data-sort-value="0.39" | 390 m || single || 10 days || 31 Mar 2001 || 21 || align=left | Disc.: Kitt Peak Obs. || 
|- id="2001 FN215" bgcolor=#fefefe
| 0 ||  || MBA-I || 18.04 || data-sort-value="0.73" | 730 m || multiple || 2001–2021 || 04 Oct 2021 || 121 || align=left | Disc.: Kitt Peak Obs.Alt.: 2014 WH196, 2016 EB141 || 
|- id="2001 FO215" bgcolor=#d6d6d6
| – ||  || MBA-O || 18.2 || 1.3 km || single || 10 days || 31 Mar 2001 || 10 || align=left | Disc.: Kitt Peak Obs. || 
|- id="2001 FQ215" bgcolor=#d6d6d6
| 5 ||  || MBA-O || 19.4 || data-sort-value="0.73" | 730 m || multiple || 2001–2019 || 02 Nov 2019 || 19 || align=left | Disc.: Kitt Peak Obs. || 
|- id="2001 FS215" bgcolor=#fefefe
| – ||  || MBA-I || 20.4 || data-sort-value="0.25" | 250 m || single || 9 days || 30 Mar 2001 || 16 || align=left | Disc.: Kitt Peak Obs. || 
|- id="2001 FT215" bgcolor=#d6d6d6
| – ||  || MBA-O || 17.8 || 1.5 km || single || 10 days || 31 Mar 2001 || 20 || align=left | Disc.: Kitt Peak Obs. || 
|- id="2001 FU215" bgcolor=#E9E9E9
| 5 ||  || MBA-M || 18.51 || 14 km || multiple || 2001-2015 || 25 May 2015 || 29 || align=left | Disc.: Kitt Peak Obs.Alt.: 2015 KZ276 || 
|- id="2001 FV215" bgcolor=#fefefe
| – ||  || MBA-I || 19.5 || data-sort-value="0.37" | 370 m || single || 10 days || 31 Mar 2001 || 17 || align=left | Disc.: Kitt Peak Obs. || 
|- id="2001 FW215" bgcolor=#d6d6d6
| 0 ||  || MBA-O || 17.01 || 2.2 km || multiple || 2001–2021 || 26 Nov 2021 || 46 || align=left | Disc.: Kitt Peak Obs. || 
|- id="2001 FX215" bgcolor=#d6d6d6
| – ||  || MBA-O || 18.2 || 1.3 km || single || 10 days || 31 Mar 2001 || 20 || align=left | Disc.: Kitt Peak Obs. || 
|- id="2001 FY215" bgcolor=#d6d6d6
| – ||  || MBA-O || 18.9 || data-sort-value="0.92" | 920 m || single || 10 days || 31 Mar 2001 || 16 || align=left | Disc.: Kitt Peak Obs. || 
|- id="2001 FZ215" bgcolor=#E9E9E9
| 1 ||  || MBA-M || 18.7 || data-sort-value="0.76" | 760 m || multiple || 2001–2019 || 30 Aug 2019 || 42 || align=left | Disc.: Kitt Peak Obs. || 
|- id="2001 FA216" bgcolor=#d6d6d6
| – ||  || MBA-O || 19.4 || data-sort-value="0.73" | 730 m || single || 10 days || 31 Mar 2001 || 16 || align=left | Disc.: Kitt Peak Obs. || 
|- id="2001 FC216" bgcolor=#d6d6d6
| – ||  || MBA-O || 17.8 || 1.5 km || single || 10 days || 31 Mar 2001 || 17 || align=left | Disc.: Kitt Peak Obs. || 
|- id="2001 FD216" bgcolor=#E9E9E9
| – ||  || MBA-M || 19.1 || data-sort-value="0.45" | 450 m || single || 2 days || 23 Mar 2001 || 10 || align=left | Disc.: Kitt Peak Obs. || 
|- id="2001 FE216" bgcolor=#E9E9E9
| 0 ||  || MBA-M || 18.16 || data-sort-value="0.96" | 960 m || multiple || 2001-2021 || 26 Nov 2021 || 29 || align=left | Disc.: Kitt Peak Obs. || 
|- id="2001 FF216" bgcolor=#FA8072
| – ||  || MCA || 20.0 || data-sort-value="0.30" | 300 m || single || 10 days || 31 Mar 2001 || 18 || align=left | Disc.: Kitt Peak Obs. || 
|- id="2001 FH216" bgcolor=#E9E9E9
| – ||  || MBA-M || 18.5 || data-sort-value="0.84" | 840 m || single || 10 days || 31 Mar 2001 || 16 || align=left | Disc.: Kitt Peak Obs. || 
|- id="2001 FJ216" bgcolor=#d6d6d6
| 5 ||  || MBA-O || 18.3 || 1.2 km || multiple || 2001–2003 || 30 Sep 2003 || 22 || align=left | Disc.: Kitt Peak Obs.Alt.: 2003 SG267 || 
|- id="2001 FK216" bgcolor=#E9E9E9
| – ||  || MBA-M || 19.8 || data-sort-value="0.61" | 610 m || single || 2 days || 23 Mar 2001 || 10 || align=left | Disc.: Kitt Peak Obs. || 
|- id="2001 FL216" bgcolor=#d6d6d6
| 2 ||  || MBA-O || 17.6 || 1.7 km || multiple || 2001–2017 || 17 Mar 2017 || 28 || align=left | Disc.: Kitt Peak Obs. || 
|- id="2001 FM216" bgcolor=#fefefe
| – ||  || MBA-I || 20.1 || data-sort-value="0.28" | 280 m || single || 10 days || 31 Mar 2001 || 17 || align=left | Disc.: Kitt Peak Obs. || 
|- id="2001 FN216" bgcolor=#fefefe
| – ||  || MBA-I || 20.3 || data-sort-value="0.26" | 260 m || single || 10 days || 31 Mar 2001 || 14 || align=left | Disc.: Kitt Peak Obs. || 
|- id="2001 FO216" bgcolor=#d6d6d6
| – ||  || MBA-O || 19.1 || data-sort-value="0.84" | 840 m || single || 10 days || 31 Mar 2001 || 13 || align=left | Disc.: Kitt Peak Obs. || 
|- id="2001 FQ216" bgcolor=#fefefe
| – ||  || MBA-I || 20.8 || data-sort-value="0.21" | 210 m || single || 2 days || 23 Mar 2001 || 10 || align=left | Disc.: Kitt Peak Obs. || 
|- id="2001 FR216" bgcolor=#d6d6d6
| – ||  || MBA-O || 19.2 || data-sort-value="0.80" | 800 m || single || 10 days || 31 Mar 2001 || 20 || align=left | Disc.: Kitt Peak Obs. || 
|- id="2001 FS216" bgcolor=#fefefe
| – ||  || MBA-I || 20.0 || data-sort-value="0.30" | 300 m || single || 10 days || 31 Mar 2001 || 13 || align=left | Disc.: Kitt Peak Obs. || 
|- id="2001 FU216" bgcolor=#fefefe
| 4 ||  || MBA-I || 18.83 || data-sort-value="0.52" | 520 m || multiple || 2001–2016 || 04 Oct 2016 || 25 || align=left | Disc.: Kitt Peak Obs. || 
|- id="2001 FX216" bgcolor=#fefefe
| 0 ||  || MBA-I || 19.00 || data-sort-value="0.47" | 470 m || multiple || 2001–2021 || 11 Nov 2021 || 56 || align=left | Disc.: Kitt Peak Obs.Alt.: 2012 GQ15 || 
|- id="2001 FY216" bgcolor=#d6d6d6
| 3 ||  || MBA-O || 17.2 || 2.0 km || multiple || 2001–2018 || 15 May 2018 || 37 || align=left | Disc.: Kitt Peak Obs. || 
|- id="2001 FZ216" bgcolor=#d6d6d6
| – ||  || MBA-O || 20.4 || data-sort-value="0.46" | 460 m || single || 9 days || 30 Mar 2001 || 18 || align=left | Disc.: Kitt Peak Obs. || 
|}
back to top

References 
 

Lists of unnumbered minor planets